= List of molossids =

Species in mammal family Molossidae

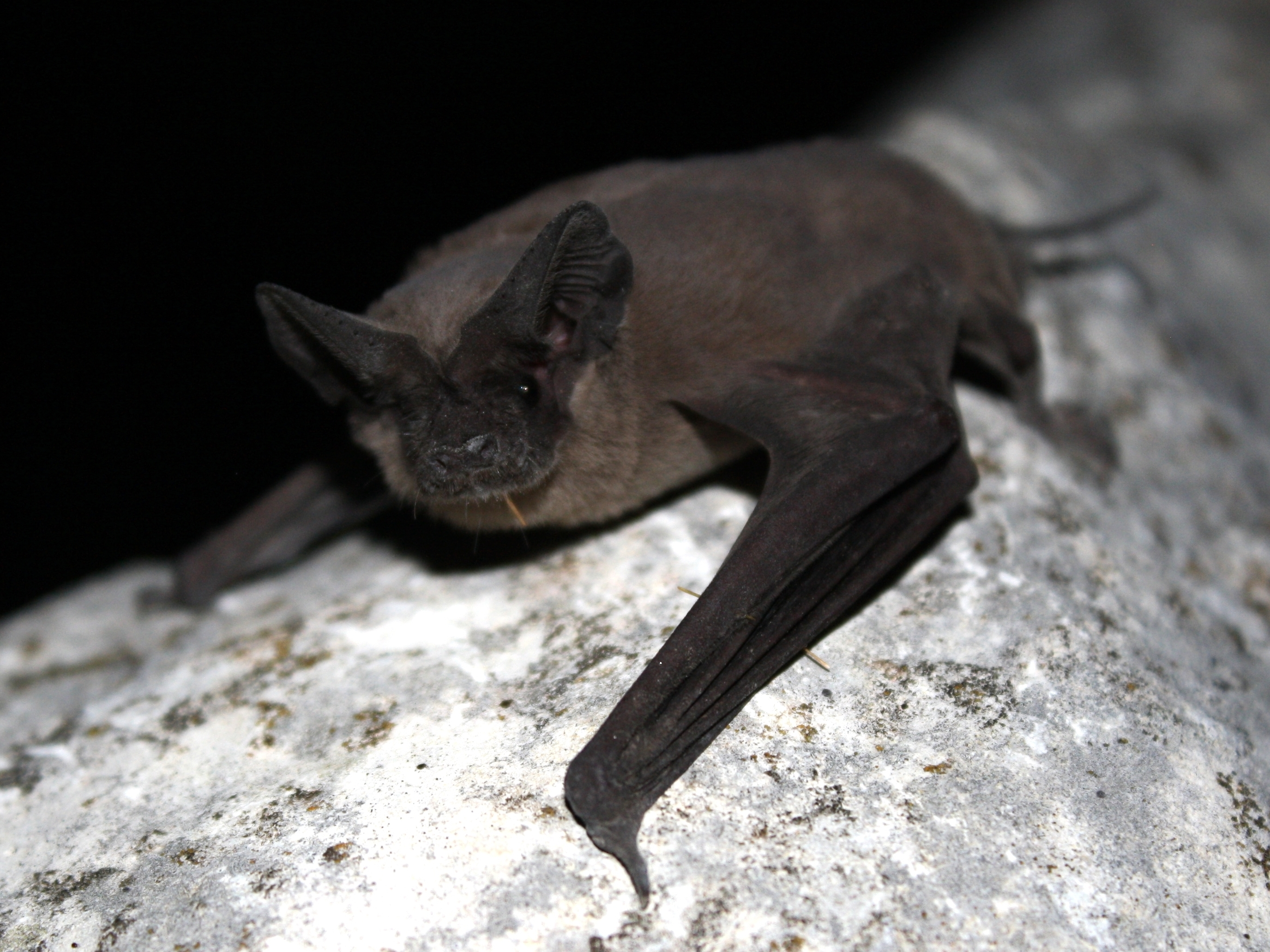
Mexican free-tailed bat (Tadarida brasiliensis)

Molossidae is one of the twenty families of bats in the mammalian order Chiroptera and part of the microbat suborder. Members of this family are called a molossid, or a free-tailed bat. They are named for their tail, which extends past the uropatagium, a membrane that connects the legs of bats. They are found in all continents besides Antarctica, primarily in caves, forests, savannas, and shrublands, though some species can also be found in deserts, rocky areas, or coastal areas. They range in size from the blunt-eared bat, at 3 cm (1 in) plus a 2 cm (1 in) tail, to the hairless bat, at 18 cm (7 in) plus a 8 cm (3 in) tail. Like all bats, molossids are capable of true and sustained flight, and have forearm lengths ranging from 2 cm (1 in) for many species to 9 cm (4 in) in the hairless bat, big bonneted bat, and western mastiff bat. They are all insectivorous and eat a variety of insects and spiders. Almost no molossids have population estimates, though the Mexican free-tailed bat is estimated to have a population of nearly 100 million, as one of the most numerous mammals in the world, while seven species—the blunt-eared bat, equatorial dog-faced bat, Fijian mastiff bat, La Touche's free-tailed bat, Natal free-tailed bat, São Tomé free-tailed bat, and Solomons mastiff bat—are categorized as endangered species, with populations as low as 200.

The 133 extant species of Molossidae are divided between two subfamilies, Molossinae and Tomopeatinae. Molossinae contains 132 species grouped into 21 genera, while Tomopeatinae contains only a single species. A few extinct prehistoric molossid species have been discovered, though due to ongoing research and discoveries the exact number and categorization is not fixed.

== Conventions ==
IUCN Red List categories
Conservation status
- EX: Extinct (0 species)
- EW: Extinct in the wild (0 species)
- CR: Critically endangered (0 species)
- EN: Endangered (7 species)
- VU: Vulnerable (6 species)
- NT: Near threatened (5 species)
- LC: Least concern (77 species)

Other categories
- DD: Data deficient (24 species)
- NE: Not evaluated (14 species)

The author citation for the species or genus is given after the scientific name; parentheses around the author citation indicate that this was not the original taxonomic placement. Conservation status codes listed follow the International Union for Conservation of Nature (IUCN) Red List of Threatened Species. Range maps are provided wherever possible; if a range map is not available, a description of the molossid's range is provided. Ranges are based on the IUCN Red List for that species unless otherwise noted.

== Classification ==
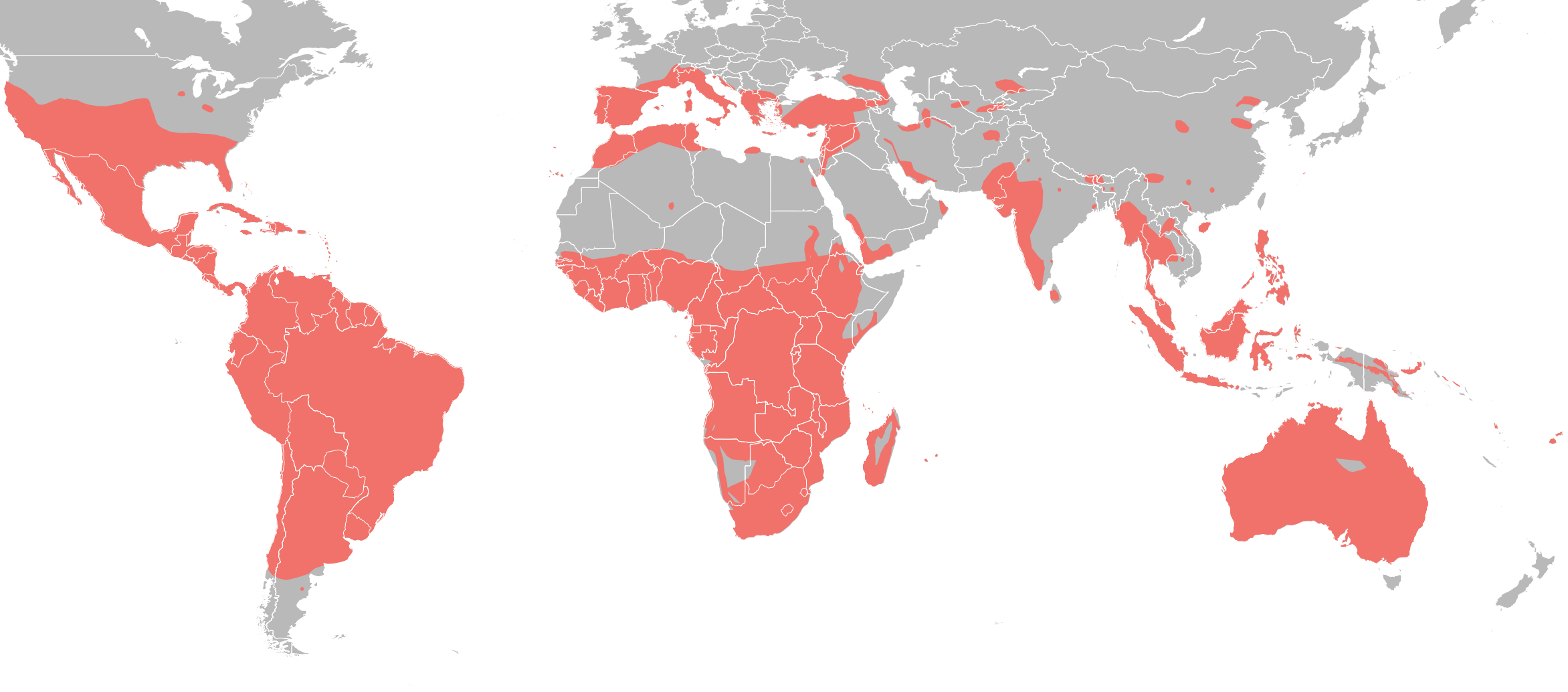
Molossidae distribution

The family Molossidae consists of two subfamilies: Molossinae, containing 132 species divided into 21 genera, and Tomopeatinae, which consists of a single species.

Family Molossidae

- Subfamily Molossinae
  - Genus Austronomus (Australasian free-tailed bats): two species
  - Genus Cabreramops (Equatorial dog-faced bat): one species
  - Genus Cheiromeles (naked bats): two species
  - Genus Cynomops (dog-faced bats): nine species
  - Genus Eumops (bonneted bats): seventeen species
  - Genus Micronomus (east-coast free-tailed bat): one species
  - Genus Molossops (dog-faced bats): three species
  - Genus Molossus (velvety free-tailed bats): sixteen species
  - Genus Mops (free-tailed bats): thirty-six species
  - Genus Mormopterus (little mastiff bats): seven species
  - Genus Myopterus (African free-tailed bats): two species
  - Genus Neoplatymops (Mato Grosso dog-faced bat): one species
  - Genus Nyctinomops (free-tailed bats): four species
  - Genus Nyctinomus (Egyptian free-tailed bat): one species
  - Genus Otomops (mastiff bats): eight species
  - Genus Ozimops (Australian free-tailed bats): nine species
  - Genus Platymops (Peters's flat-headed bat): one species
  - Genus Promops (mastiff bats): three species
  - Genus Sauromys (Roberts's flat-headed bat): one species
  - Genus Setirostris (hairy-nosed free-tailed bat): one species
  - Genus Tadarida (guano bats): seven species
- Subfamily Tomopeatinae
  - Genus Tomopeas (blunt-eared bat): one species

- Molossidae
  - Molossinae
    - Cheiromeles
    - - - - Mormopterus
          - Ozimops
          - Platymops
        - - Micronomus
          - Setirostris
      - - - - Austronomus
            - Sauromys
            - - Tadarida
              - Nyctinomus
          - - Myopterus
            - - Chaerephon
              - Mops
          - Otomops
        - - - Nyctinomops
            - - Cynomops
              - - Cabreramops
                - - Molossops
                  - Neoplatymops
          - - - Molossus
              - Promops
            - Eumops
  - Tomopeatinae
    Tomopeas

== Molossids ==
The following classification is based on the taxonomy described by the reference work Mammal Species of the World (2005), with augmentation by generally accepted proposals made since using molecular phylogenetic analysis, as supported by both the IUCN SSC Bat Specialist Group and the American Society of Mammalogists.

=== Subfamily Molossinae ===
Genus Austronomus – Troughton, 1944 – two species
Common name	Scientific name and subspecies	Range	Size and ecology	IUCN status and estimated population
White-striped free-tailed bat	A. australis Gray, 1838	Australia	Size: 8–10 cm (3–4 in), plus 4–6 cm (2 in) tail 5–7 cm (2–3 in) forearm length Habitat: Forest, savanna, shrubland, grassland, and desert	LC Unknown
New Guinea free-tailed bat	A. kuboriensis (McKean & Calaby, 1968)	New Guinea	Size: 7–9 cm (3–4 in), plus 4–5 cm (2 in) tail 5–6 cm (2 in) forearm length Habitat: Forest and grassland	LC Unknown

Genus Cabreramops – Ibáñez, 1980 – one species
Common name	Scientific name and subspecies	Range	Size and ecology	IUCN status and estimated population
Equatorial dog-faced bat	C. aequatorianus A. Cabrera, 1917	Ecuador	Size: 4–6 cm (2 in), plus 2–4 cm (1–2 in) tail 3–4 cm (1–2 in) forearm length Habitat: Forest	EN Unknown

Genus Cheiromeles – Horsfield, 1824 – two species
Common name	Scientific name and subspecies	Range	Size and ecology	IUCN status and estimated population
Hairless bat	C. torquatus Horsfield, 1824	Southeastern Asia	Size: 12–18 cm (5–7 in), plus 6–8 cm (2–3 in) tail 6–9 cm (2–4 in) forearm length Habitat: Forest and caves	LC Unknown
Lesser naked bat	C. parvidens Miller & Hollister, 1921	Indonesia and the Philippines	Size: 10–12 cm (4–5 in), plus 5–7 cm (2–3 in) tail 6–8 cm (2–3 in) forearm length Habitat: Caves and forest	LC Unknown

Genus Cynomops – Thomas, 1920 – nine species
Common name	Scientific name and subspecies	Range	Size and ecology	IUCN status and estimated population
Awa dog-faced bat	C. kuizha Arenas-Viveros, Sánchez-Vendizú, Giraldo, & Salazar-Bravo, 2021	Northwestern South America	Size: About 8 cm (3 in), plus about 2 cm (1 in) tail 3–5 cm (1–2 in) forearm length Habitat: Forest	NE Unknown
Cinnamon dog-faced bat	C. abrasus Temminck, 1827	South America	Size: 7–9 cm (3–4 in), plus 3–5 cm (1–2 in) tail 4–5 cm (2 in) forearm length Habitat: Forest	DD Unknown
Freeman's dog-faced bat	C. freemani Moras, Gregorin, Sattler, & Tavares, 2018	Panama	Size: 5–7 cm (2–3 in), plus 2–4 cm (1–2 in) tail 3–4 cm (1–2 in) forearm length Habitat: Forest	NE Unknown
Greenhall's dog-faced bat	C. greenhalli Goodwin, 1958	Northern South America	Size: 5–8 cm (2–3 in), plus 2–4 cm (1–2 in) tail 3–4 cm (1–2 in) forearm length Habitat: Forest	LC Unknown
Mastiff dog-faced bat	C. mastivus Thomas, 1911	Northern South America	Size: 7–9 cm (3–4 in), plus 3–5 cm (1–2 in) tail 4–6 cm (2 in) forearm length Habitat: Forest	NE Unknown
Mexican dog-faced bat	C. mexicanus Jones & Genoways, 1967	Scattered Mexico and Central America	Size: 6–8 cm (2–3 in), plus 2–4 cm (1–2 in) tail 3–4 cm (1–2 in) forearm length Habitat: Forest	LC Unknown
Miller's dog-faced bat	C. milleri (Osgood, 1914)	Northwestern and central South America	Size: 5–8 cm (2–3 in), plus 2–4 cm (1–2 in) tail 3–4 cm (1–2 in) forearm length Habitat: Forest	LC Unknown
Southern dog-faced bat	C. planirostris Peters, 1866	South America	Size: 5–8 cm (2–3 in), plus 2–4 cm (1–2 in) tail 2–4 cm (1–2 in) forearm length Habitat: Forest	LC Unknown
Waorani dog-faced bat	C. tonkigui Moras, Gregorin, Sattler, & Tavares, 2018	Northwestern South America	Size: 5–7 cm (2–3 in), plus 2–3 cm (1–1 in) tail 3–4 cm (1–2 in) forearm length Habitat: Forest	NE Unknown

Genus Eumops – Miller, 1906 – seventeen species
Common name	Scientific name and subspecies	Range	Size and ecology	IUCN status and estimated population
Big bonneted bat	E. dabbenei Thomas, 1914	South America	Size: 7–12 cm (3–5 in), plus 5–7 cm (2–3 in) tail 7–9 cm (3–4 in) forearm length Habitat: Forest and savanna	LC Unknown
Black bonneted bat	E. auripendulus Shaw, 1800 Two subspecies: E. a. auripendulus; E. a. major	South America, Central America, and southern Mexico	Size: 7–10 cm (3–4 in), plus 4–7 cm (2–3 in) tail 5–7 cm (2–3 in) forearm length Habitat: Forest and savanna	LC Unknown
Chimaera bonneted bat	E. chimaera Gregorin, Moras, Acosta, Vasconcellos, Poma, Santos, & Paca, 2016	Southeastern South America	Size: 7–10 cm (3–4 in), plus 5–7 cm (2–3 in) tail 6–7 cm (2–3 in) forearm length Habitat: Forest and caves	NE Unknown
Chiribaya bonneted bat	E. chiribaya Medina, Gregorin, Zeballos, Zamora, & Moras, 2014	Southwestern Peru	Size: About 8 cm (3 in), plus 5–6 cm (2 in) tail 6–7 cm (2–3 in) forearm length Habitat: Forest and caves	NE Unknown
Colombian bonneted bat	E. trumbulli (Thomas, 1901)	North-central South America	Size: 9–13 cm (4–5 in), plus 4–6 cm (2 in) tail 6–8 cm (2–3 in) forearm length Habitat: Forest and rocky areas	LC Unknown
Delta bonneted bat	E. delticus Thomas, 1923	Northern South America	Size: 6–8 cm (2–3 in), plus 3–5 cm (1–2 in) tail 4–5 cm (2 in) forearm length Habitat: Forest	DD Unknown
Dwarf bonneted bat	E. bonariensis Peters, 1867	South America, Central America, and southern Mexico	Size: 7–9 cm (3–4 in), plus 3–5 cm (1–2 in) tail 4–5 cm (2 in) forearm length Habitat: Forest	LC Unknown
Fierce bonneted bat	E. ferox Gundlach, 1861	Central America, Cuba, and southern Mexico	Size: 7–10 cm (3–4 in), plus 4–6 cm (2 in) tail 5–7 cm (2–3 in) forearm length Habitat: Forest	LC Unknown
Florida bonneted bat	E. floridanus (Allen, 1932)	Southern Florida	Size: 7–10 cm (3–4 in), plus 4–7 cm (2–3 in) tail 6–7 cm (2–3 in) forearm length Habitat: Forest	VU 3,000–5,000
Guianan bonneted bat	E. maurus Thomas, 1901	Scattered northern South America	Size: 6–9 cm (2–4 in), plus 4–6 cm (2 in) tail 5–7 cm (2–3 in) forearm length Habitat: Savanna and forest	DD Unknown
Northern dwarf bonneted bat	E. nanus Miller, 1900	Northern South America, Central America, and southern Mexico	Size: 4–7 cm (2–3 in), plus 2–5 cm (1–2 in) tail 3–5 cm (1–2 in) forearm length Habitat: Forest	LC Unknown
Patagonian bonneted bat	E. patagonicus Thomas, 1924	South-central South America	Size: 5–8 cm (2–3 in), plus 2–5 cm (1–2 in) tail 4–5 cm (2 in) forearm length Habitat: Forest	LC Unknown
Sanborn's bonneted bat	E. hansae Sanborn, 1932	South America, Central America, and southern Mexico	Size: 6–8 cm (2–3 in), plus 2–5 cm (1–2 in) tail 3–5 cm (1–2 in) forearm length Habitat: Forest, savanna, and coastal marine	LC Unknown
Underwood's bonneted bat	E. underwoodi Goodwin, 1940	Southern North America and Central America	Size: 8–12 cm (3–5 in), plus 4–7 cm (2–3 in) tail 6–8 cm (2–3 in) forearm length Habitat: Forest and desert	LC Unknown
Wagner's bonneted bat	E. glaucinus Wagner, 1843	South America, Central America, and southern Mexico	Size: 8–10 cm (3–4 in), plus 4–7 cm (2–3 in) tail 5–7 cm (2–3 in) forearm length Habitat: Forest	LC Unknown
Western mastiff bat	E. perotis Schinz, 1821	South America and southwestern North America	Size: 10–12 cm (4–5 in), plus 5–8 cm (2–3 in) tail 7–9 cm (3–4 in) forearm length Habitat: Forest and caves	LC Unknown
Wilson's bonneted bat	E. wilsoni Baker, McDonough, Swier, Larsen, Carrera, & Ammerman, 2009	Ecuador and Peru	Size: 6–9 cm (2–4 in), plus 4–5 cm (2 in) tail 5–6 cm (2 in) forearm length Habitat: Forest	DD Unknown

Genus Micronomus – Gray, 1839 – one species
Common name	Scientific name and subspecies	Range	Size and ecology	IUCN status and estimated population
East-coast free-tailed bat	M. norfolkensis J. E. Gray, 1839	Eastern Australia	Size: 5–6 cm (2 in), plus 3–5 cm (1–2 in) tail 3–5 cm (1–2 in) forearm length Habitat: Forest and shrubland	NT 10,000–11,000

Genus Molossops – Peters, 1865 – three species
Common name	Scientific name and subspecies	Range	Size and ecology	IUCN status and estimated population
Dwarf dog-faced bat	M. temminckii Tullberg, 1893	South America	Size: 4–6 cm (2 in), plus 1–3 cm (0–1 in) tail 2–4 cm (1–2 in) forearm length Habitat: Forest	LC Unknown
Colombian dog-faced bat	M. griseiventer Sanborn, 1941	Colombia	Size: 4–6 cm (2 in), plus 1–3 cm (0–1 in) tail 2–4 cm (1–2 in) forearm length Habitat: Forest	NE Unknown
Rufous dog-faced bat	M. neglectus Williams & Genoways, 1980	South America	Size: 5–7 cm (2–3 in), plus 2–4 cm (1–2 in) tail 3–4 cm (1–2 in) forearm length Habitat: Unknown	DD Unknown

Genus Molossus – Geoffroy, 1805 – sixteen species
Common name	Scientific name and subspecies	Range	Size and ecology	IUCN status and estimated population
Alvarez's mastiff bat	M. alvarezi González-Ruiz, Ramírez-Pulido, & Arroyo-Cabrales, 2011	Yucatán Peninsula	Size: 6–9 cm (2–4 in), plus 4–5 cm (2 in) tail 4–5 cm (2 in) forearm length Habitat: Forest	DD Unknown
Aztec mastiff bat	M. aztecus Saussure, 1860	Scattered Mexico and Central America	Size: 5–9 cm (2–4 in), plus 3–5 cm (1–2 in) tail 3–5 cm (1–2 in) forearm length Habitat: Forest	LC Unknown
Black mastiff bat	M. rufus Geoffroy, 1805	Mexico, Central America, and South America	Size: Unknown Habitat: Forest and shrubland	LC Unknown
Bonda mastiff bat	M. bondae Allen, 1904	Central America and northern South America	Size: 6–8 cm (2–3 in), plus 3–5 cm (1–2 in) tail 3–5 cm (1–2 in) forearm length Habitat: Forest, savanna, and shrubland	LC Unknown
Coiban mastiff bat	M. coibensis Allen, 1904	Northern South America and Central America	Size: 5–8 cm (2–3 in), plus 2–4 cm (1–2 in) tail 3–4 cm (1–2 in) forearm length Habitat: Forest	LC Unknown
Ebon mastiff bat	M. nigricans Miller, 1902	Mexico	Size: 8–11 cm (3–4 in), plus 3–6 cm (1–2 in) tail 4–6 cm (2 in) forearm length Habitat: Forest and shrubland	NE Unknown
Fenton's mastiff bat	M. fentoni Loureiro, Lim, & Engstrom, 2018	Guyana and Ecuador	Size: 5–7 cm (2–3 in), plus 3–4 cm (1–2 in) tail 3–4 cm (1–2 in) forearm length Habitat: Forest	NE Unknown
Keel-nosed mastiff bat	M. tropidorhynchus J. E. Gray, 1839	Cuba	Size: 5–8 cm (2–3 in), plus 3–5 cm (1–2 in) tail 3–5 cm (1–2 in) forearm length Habitat: Forest	NE Unknown
Melin's mastiff bat	M. melini Montani, Tomasco, Barberis, Romano, Barquez, & Díaz, 2021	Argentina	Size: 7–8 cm (3 in), plus 4–5 cm (2 in) tail 4–5 cm (2 in) forearm length Habitat: Forest	NE Unknown
Miller's mastiff bat	M. pretiosus Miller, 1902	Southern Mexico, Central America, and northern South America	Size: 7–8 cm (3 in), plus 3–5 cm (1–2 in) tail 4–6 cm (2 in) forearm length Habitat: Forest and caves	LC Unknown
Paraná mastiff bat	M. paranaensis Caraballo, Pavé, Argoitia, Schierloh, & Chambi Velasquez, 2024	Northeastern Argentina	Size: 5–8 cm (2–3 in), plus 3–5 cm (1–2 in) tail 3–5 cm (1–2 in) forearm length Habitat: Forest and shrubland	NE Unknown
River mastiff bat	M. fluminensis Lataste, 1891	Guyana and Ecuador	Size: Unknown Habitat: Forest and shrubland	NE Unknown
Sinaloan mastiff bat	M. sinaloae Allen, 1906 Two subspecies: M. s. sinaloae; M. s. trinitatus	Southern Mexico, Central America, and northern South America	Size: 7–9 cm (3–4 in), plus 4–6 cm (2 in) tail 4–5 cm (2 in) forearm length Habitat: Forest and caves	LC Unknown
Thomas's mastiff bat	M. currentium Thomas, 1900	South-central South America	Size: 6–8 cm (2–3 in), plus 3–5 cm (1–2 in) tail 3–5 cm (1–2 in) forearm length Habitat: Forest, savanna, and grassland	LC Unknown
Verrill's mastiff bat	M. verrilli Allen, 1908	Dominican Republic and Haiti	Size: 5–8 cm (2–3 in), plus 3–5 cm (1–2 in) tail 3–5 cm (1–2 in) forearm length Habitat: Forest	NE Unknown
Velvety free-tailed bat	M. molossus (Pallas, 1766) Five subspecies: M. m. daulensis; M. m. debilis; M. m. fortis; M. m. milleri; M. m. molossus	Mexico, Caribbean, Central America, and South America	Size: 5–8 cm (2–3 in), plus 3–5 cm (1–2 in) tail 3–5 cm (1–2 in) forearm length Habitat: Forest	LC Unknown

Genus Mops – Lesson, 1842 – 36 species
Common name	Scientific name and subspecies	Range	Size and ecology	IUCN status and estimated population
Angolan free-tailed bat	M. condylurus Smith, 1833	Sub-Saharan Africa	Size: 6–8 cm (2–3 in), plus 3–6 cm (1–2 in) tail 4–6 cm (2 in) forearm length Habitat: Savanna	LC Unknown
Ansorge's free-tailed bat	M. ansorgei (Thomas, 1913)	Sub-Saharan Africa	Size: 6–9 cm (2–4 in), plus 3–5 cm (1–2 in) tail 4–6 cm (2 in) forearm length Habitat: Forest, savanna, and rocky areas	LC Unknown
Bakari's free-tailed bat	M. bakarii Stanley, 2008	Tanzania	Size: 6–7 cm (2–3 in), plus 2–4 cm (1–2 in) tail 3–4 cm (1–2 in) forearm length Habitat: Forest	DD Unknown
Black and red free-tailed bat	M. jobimena Goodman & Cardiff, 2004	Western Madagascar	Size: 7–8 cm (3 in), plus 3–6 cm (1–2 in) tail 4–5 cm (2 in) forearm length Habitat: Caves and forest	LC Unknown
Chapin's free-tailed bat	M. chapini Allen, 1917	Central and western Africa	Size: 5–6 cm (2 in), plus 2–5 cm (1–2 in) tail 3–4 cm (1–2 in) forearm length Habitat: Savanna	LC Unknown
Duke of Abruzzi's free-tailed bat	M. aloysiisabaudiae (Festa, 1907)	Central and western Africa	Size: 7–9 cm (3–4 in), plus 3–5 cm (1–2 in) tail 4–6 cm (2 in) forearm length Habitat: Savanna and forest	LC Unknown
Dwarf free-tailed bat	M. nanulus Allen, 1917	Central and western Africa	Size: 5–6 cm (2 in), plus 1–3 cm (0–1 in) tail 2–4 cm (1–2 in) forearm length Habitat: Forest	LC Unknown
Fijian mastiff bat	M. bregullae (Felten, 1964)	Fiji and Vanuatu	Size: 6–7 cm (2–3 in), plus 4–5 cm (2 in) tail 5–6 cm (2 in) forearm length Habitat: Forest and caves	EN 5,000–7,000
Gallagher's free-tailed bat	M. gallagheri (Harrison, 1975)	Democratic Republic of the Congo	Size: About 5 cm (2 in), plus about 3 cm (1 in) tail About 4 cm (2 in) forearm length Habitat: Forest	DD Unknown
Gland-tailed free-tailed bat	M. bemmeleni (Jentink, 1879) Two subspecies: M. b. bemmeleni; M. b. cistura	Central and western Africa	Size: 6–7 cm (2–3 in), plus 3–4 cm (1–2 in) tail 4–5 cm (2 in) forearm length Habitat: Forest and savanna	LC Unknown
Grandidier's free-tailed bat	M. leucogaster (Grandidier, 1869)	Madagascar	Size: 5–7 cm (2–3 in), plus 2–4 cm (1–2 in) tail 3–4 cm (1–2 in) forearm length Habitat: Forest and savanna	LC Unknown
Lappet-eared free-tailed bat	M. major (Trouessart, 1897)	Eastern and western Africa	Size: 5–8 cm (2–3 in), plus 2–5 cm (1–2 in) tail 3–5 cm (1–2 in) forearm length Habitat: Savanna and rocky areas	LC Unknown
Little free-tailed bat	M. pumilus (Cretzschmar, 1826)	Sub-Saharan Africa	Size: 4–7 cm (2–3 in), plus 2–4 cm (1–2 in) tail 3–5 cm (1–2 in) forearm length Habitat: Forest, savanna, and shrubland	LC Unknown
Madagascar free-tailed bat	M. atsinanana Goodman, Buccas, Naidoo, Ratrimomanarivo, Taylor, & Lamb, 2010	Eastern Madagascar	Size: 6–7 cm (2–3 in), plus 2–4 cm (1–2 in) tail 3–5 cm (1–2 in) forearm length Habitat: Forest	LC Unknown
Malagasy white-bellied free-tailed bat	M. leucostigma Allen, 1918	Madagascar	Size: 7–9 cm (3–4 in), plus 3–5 cm (1–2 in) tail 4–5 cm (2 in) forearm length Habitat: Forest and caves	LC Unknown
Malayan free-tailed bat	M. mops (Blainville, 1840)	Indonesia and Malaysia	Size: 6–8 cm (2–3 in), plus 3–4 cm (1–2 in) tail 4–5 cm (2 in) forearm length Habitat: Forest	NT Unknown
Medje free-tailed bat	M. congicus Allen, 1917	Central Africa	Size: 9–10 cm (4 in), plus 3–6 cm (1–2 in) tail 5–6 cm (2 in) forearm length Habitat: Forest	LC Unknown
Midas free-tailed bat	M. midas (Sundevall, 1843)	Scattered Africa	Size: 8–10 cm (3–4 in), plus 3–6 cm (1–2 in) tail 5–7 cm (2–3 in) forearm length Habitat: Forest, savanna, and desert	LC Unknown
Mongalla free-tailed bat	M. demonstrator Thomas, 1903	Western and central Africa	Size: 7–9 cm (3–4 in), plus 2–4 cm (1–2 in) tail 4–5 cm (2 in) forearm length Habitat: Savanna	LC Unknown
Niangara free-tailed bat	M. niangarae Allen, 1917	Central Africa	Size: About 9 cm (4 in), plus about 3 cm (1 in) tail About 5 cm (2 in) forearm length Habitat: Unknown	DD Unknown
Nigerian free-tailed bat	M. nigeriae Thomas, 1913 Two subspecies: M. n. nigeriae; M. n. spillmani	Sub-Saharan Africa	Size: 6–8 cm (2–3 in), plus 3–6 cm (1–2 in) tail 4–6 cm (2 in) forearm length Habitat: Savanna and forest	LC Unknown
Northern freetail bat	M. jobensis (Miller, 1902) Two subspecies: M. j. colonicus; M. j. jobensis	Northern Australia and southeastern Asia	Size: 5–9 cm (2–4 in), plus 3–5 cm (1–2 in) tail 4–6 cm (2 in) forearm length Habitat: Forest, savanna, shrubland, and caves	LC Unknown
Northern free-tailed bat	M. johorensis (Dobson, 1873)	Indonesia and Malaysia	Size: 6–8 cm (2–3 in), plus 3–5 cm (1–2 in) tail 4–5 cm (2 in) forearm length Habitat: Forest	VU Unknown
Peterson's free-tailed bat	M. petersoni El-Rayah, 1981	Western Africa	Size: About 7 cm (3 in), plus about 3 cm (1 in) tail 3–4 cm (1–2 in) forearm length Habitat: Forest	NT Unknown
Railer bat	M. thersites (Thomas, 1903)	Western and central Africa	Size: 6–7 cm (2–3 in), plus 2–4 cm (1–2 in) tail 3–5 cm (1–2 in) forearm length Habitat: Forest	LC Unknown
Russet free-tailed bat	M. russatus Allen, 1917	Western and central Africa	Size: 6–8 cm (2–3 in), plus 2–4 cm (1–2 in) tail 4–5 cm (2 in) forearm length Habitat: Forest and savanna	DD Unknown
São Tomé free-tailed bat	M. tomensis (Juste & Ibáñez, 1993)	São Tomé and Príncipe	Size: 5–6 cm (2 in), plus 2–4 cm (1–2 in) tail 3–4 cm (1–2 in) forearm length Habitat: Forest and savanna	EN Unknown
Seychelles free-tailed bat	M. pusillus Miller, 1902	Comoro Islands and Seychelles	Size: 5–6 cm (2 in), plus 2–4 cm (1–2 in) tail 3–4 cm (1–2 in) forearm length Habitat: Forest	VU Unknown
Sierra Leone free-tailed bat	M. brachypterus (Peters, 1852) Two subspecies: M. b. brachypterus; M. b. leonis	Western, central, and eastern Africa	Size: 5–7 cm (2–3 in), plus 2–4 cm (1–2 in) tail 3–5 cm (1–2 in) forearm length Habitat: Forest	LC Unknown
Solomons mastiff bat	M. solomonis Troughton, 1931	Solomon Islands	Size: 5–7 cm (2–3 in), plus 3–4 cm (1–2 in) tail 4–5 cm (2 in) forearm length Habitat: Forest, caves, and coastal marine	EN Unknown
Spotted free-tailed bat	M. bivittatus (Heuglin, 1861)	Eastern Africa	Size: 7–9 cm (3–4 in), plus 3–5 cm (1–2 in) tail 4–6 cm (2 in) forearm length Habitat: Savanna, rocky areas, and caves	LC Unknown
Spurrell's free-tailed bat	M. spurrelli Dollman, 1911	Western and central Africa	Size: 5–7 cm (2–3 in), plus 2–3 cm (1 in) tail 2–3 cm (1 in) forearm length Habitat: Forest	LC Unknown
Sulawesi free-tailed bat	M. sarasinorum (von Meyer, 1899) Two subspecies: M. s. lanei; M. s. sarasinorum	Indonesia and the Philippines	Size: 6–8 cm (2–3 in), plus 3–4 cm (1–2 in) tail 3–5 cm (1–2 in) forearm length Habitat: Forest	DD Unknown
Trevor's free-tailed bat	M. trevori Allen, 1917	Western and central Africa	Size: 8–9 cm (3–4 in), plus 3–5 cm (1–2 in) tail 5–6 cm (2 in) forearm length Habitat: Forest and savanna	DD Unknown
White-bellied free-tailed bat	M. niveiventer Cabrera & Ruxton, 1926	Central Africa	Size: 7–8 cm (3 in), plus 3–4 cm (1–2 in) tail 4–5 cm (2 in) forearm length Habitat: Forest and savanna	LC Unknown
Wrinkle-lipped free-tailed bat	M. plicatus Buchanan, 1880	Eastern and southeastern Asia	Size: 6–8 cm (2–3 in), plus 2–4 cm (1–2 in) tail 4–5 cm (2 in) forearm length Habitat: Forest and caves	LC Unknown

Genus Mormopterus – Peters, 1865 – seven species
Common name	Scientific name and subspecies	Range	Size and ecology	IUCN status and estimated population
Incan little mastiff bat	M. phrudus Handley, 1956	Peru	Size: 5–6 cm (2 in), plus 2–4 cm (1–2 in) tail 3–4 cm (1–2 in) forearm length Habitat: Forest and caves	VU Unknown
Kalinowski's mastiff bat	M. kalinowskii (Thomas, 1893)	Peru and northern Chile	Size: 4–6 cm (2 in), plus 2–4 cm (1–2 in) tail 3–4 cm (1–2 in) forearm length Habitat: Shrubland and caves	LC Unknown
Little goblin bat	M. minutus (Miller, 1899)	Cuba	Size: 4–5 cm (2 in), plus 2–4 cm (1–2 in) tail 2–4 cm (1–2 in) forearm length Habitat: Forest	VU Unknown
Natal free-tailed bat	M. acetabulosus Hermann, 1804	Island of Mauritius	Size: 4–6 cm (2 in), plus 4–5 cm (2 in) tail 3–5 cm (1–2 in) forearm length Habitat: Forest, shrubland, and caves	EN Unknown
Peters's wrinkle-lipped bat	M. jugularis Peters, 1865	Madagascar	Size: 6–7 cm (2–3 in), plus 2–4 cm (1–2 in) tail 3–4 cm (1–2 in) forearm length Habitat: Forest, rocky areas, and caves	LC Unknown
Reunion little mastiff bat	M. francoismoutoui Goodman, Vuuren, Ratrimomanarivo, Probst, & Bowie, 2008	Island of Réunion	Size: 5–6 cm (2 in), plus 3–5 cm (1–2 in) tail 3–5 cm (1–2 in) forearm length Habitat: Rocky areas	LC Unknown
Sumatran mastiff bat	M. doriae K. Andersen, 1907	Island of Sumatra in Indonesia	Size: Unknown length, plus about 3 cm (1 in) tail About 4 cm (2 in) forearm length Habitat: Unknown	DD Unknown

Genus Myopterus – Geoffroy, 1818 – two species
Common name	Scientific name and subspecies	Range	Size and ecology	IUCN status and estimated population
Bini free-tailed bat	M. whitleyi (Scharff, 1900)	Central Africa	Size: 5–6 cm (2 in), plus 2–4 cm (1–2 in) tail 3–4 cm (1–2 in) forearm length Habitat: Forest	LC Unknown
Daubenton's free-tailed bat	M. daubentonii Desmarest, 1820 Two subspecies: M. d. albatus; M. d. daubentonii	Western and central Africa	Size: 6–8 cm (2–3 in), plus 3–5 cm (1–2 in) tail 4–6 cm (2 in) forearm length Habitat: Forest and savanna	DD Unknown

Genus Neoplatymops – Peterson, 1965 – one species
Common name	Scientific name and subspecies	Range	Size and ecology	IUCN status and estimated population
Mato Grosso dog-faced bat	N. mattogrossensis Vieira, 1942	Northern South America	Size: 4–6 cm (2 in), plus 2–3 cm (1 in) tail 2–3 cm (1 in) forearm length Habitat: Forest and rocky areas	LC Unknown

Genus Nyctinomops – Miller, 1865 – four species
Common name	Scientific name and subspecies	Range	Size and ecology	IUCN status and estimated population
Big free-tailed bat	N. macrotis (Gray, 1839)	North and South America	Size: 7–9 cm (3–4 in), plus 4–7 cm (2–3 in) tail 5–7 cm (2–3 in) forearm length Habitat: Forest	LC Unknown
Broad-eared bat	N. laticaudatus Geoffroy, 1805 Five subspecies: N. l. espiritosantensis; N. l. europs; N. l. gracilis; N. l. laticaudatus; N. l. yucatanicus	Mexico, Central America, and South America	Size: 5–7 cm (2–3 in), plus 3–5 cm (1–2 in) tail 4–5 cm (2 in) forearm length Habitat: Forest	LC Unknown
Peale's free-tailed bat	N. aurispinosus Peale, 1848	Mexico and South America	Size: 6–8 cm (2–3 in), plus 4–6 cm (2 in) tail 4–6 cm (2 in) forearm length Habitat: Forest and caves	LC Unknown
Pocketed free-tailed bat	N. femorosaccus (Merriam, 1889)	Mexico and southern United States	Size: 6–8 cm (2–3 in), plus 3–5 cm (1–2 in) tail 4–5 cm (2 in) forearm length Habitat: Rocky areas and caves	LC Unknown

Genus Nyctinomus – Geoffroy, 1818 – one species
Common name	Scientific name and subspecies	Range	Size and ecology	IUCN status and estimated population
Egyptian free-tailed bat	N. aegyptiaca Geoffroy, 1818	Scattered Africa, Arabian Peninsula, and southern Asia	Size: 6–9 cm (2–4 in), plus 3–5 cm (1–2 in) tail 4–6 cm (2 in) forearm length Habitat: Savanna and shrubland	LC Unknown

Genus Otomops – Thomas, 1913 – eight species
Common name	Scientific name and subspecies	Range	Size and ecology	IUCN status and estimated population
Big-eared mastiff bat	O. papuensis Lawrence, 1948	Papua New Guinea	Size: 6–8 cm (2–3 in), plus 3–4 cm (1–2 in) tail 4–6 cm (2 in) forearm length Habitat: Forest	DD Unknown
Harrison's large-eared giant mastiff bat	O. harrisoni Ralph, Richards, Taylor, Napier, & Lamb, 2015	Eastern Africa and southern Arabian Peninsula	Size: 9–11 cm (4 in), plus 4–6 cm (2 in) tail 6–8 cm (2–3 in) forearm length Habitat: Forest and savanna	VU Unknown
Javan mastiff bat	O. formosus Chasen, 1939	Indonesia	Size: 7–9 cm (3–4 in), plus 3–5 cm (1–2 in) tail 5–6 cm (2 in) forearm length Habitat: Unknown	DD Unknown
Johnstone's mastiff bat	O. johnstonei Kitchener, How, & Maryanto, 1992	Indonesia	Size: About 8 cm (3 in), plus about 4 cm (2 in) tail About 6 cm (2 in) forearm length Habitat: Forest	DD Unknown
Large-eared free-tailed bat	O. martiensseni Matschie, 1897	Scattered Sub-Saharan Africa	Size: 8–11 cm (3–4 in), plus 3–6 cm (1–2 in) tail 6–7 cm (2–3 in) forearm length Habitat: Forest and savanna	NT Unknown
Madagascar free-tailed bat	O. madagascariensis Dorst, 1953	Madagascar	Size: 8–10 cm (3–4 in), plus 3–5 cm (1–2 in) tail 5–7 cm (2–3 in) forearm length Habitat: Forest and caves	LC Unknown
Mantled mastiff bat	O. secundus Hayman, 1952	Papua New Guinea	Size: 7–8 cm (3 in), plus 3–4 cm (1–2 in) tail about 6 cm (2 in) forearm length Habitat: Forest	DD Unknown
Wroughton's free-tailed bat	O. wroughtoni (Thomas, 1913)	Scattered southern Asia	Size: 8–10 cm (3–4 in), plus 4–5 cm (2 in) tail 6–7 cm (2–3 in) forearm length Habitat: Forest and caves	DD Unknown

Genus Ozimops – Reardon, McKenzie, & Adams, 2014 – nine species
Common name	Scientific name and subspecies	Range	Size and ecology	IUCN status and estimated population
Beccari's free-tailed bat	O. beccarii Peters, 1881 Two subspecies: O. b. astrolabiensis; O. b. beccarii	Indonesia and Papua New Guinea	Size: 5–7 cm (2–3 in), plus 2–4 cm (1–2 in) tail 3–4 cm (1–2 in) forearm length Habitat: Forest, savanna, shrubland, and caves	LC Unknown
Cape York free-tailed bat	O. halli (Reardon, McKenzie, & Adams, 2014)	Northern Australia	Size: 4–6 cm (2 in), plus 2–4 cm (1–2 in) tail 3–4 cm (1–2 in) forearm length Habitat: Forest	DD Unknown
Inland free-tailed bat	O. petersi (Leche, 1884)	Australia	Size: 4–6 cm (2 in), plus 3–4 cm (1–2 in) tail 3–4 cm (1–2 in) forearm length Habitat: Desert, inland wetlands, grassland, and shrubland	LC Unknown
Loria's free-tailed bat	O. loriae Thomas, 1897	Papua New Guinea	Size: 4–5 cm (2 in), plus about 3 cm (1 in) tail 3–4 cm (1–2 in) forearm length Habitat: Forest	DD Unknown
Lumsden's free-tailed bat	O. lumsdenae (Reardon, McKenzie, & Adams, 2014)	Northern Australia	Size: 5–7 cm (2–3 in), plus 3–4 cm (1–2 in) tail 3–5 cm (1–2 in) forearm length Habitat: Forest, shrubland, grassland, and inland wetlands	LC Unknown
Northern coastal free-tailed bat	O. cobourgianus (Johnson, 1959)	Northern Australia	Size: 4–6 cm (2 in), plus 2–4 cm (1–2 in) tail 3–4 cm (1–2 in) forearm length Habitat: Forest and other	LC Unknown
Ride's free-tailed bat	O. ridei Felten, 1964	Eastern Australia	Size: 5–6 cm (2 in), plus 2–4 cm (1–2 in) tail 3–4 cm (1–2 in) forearm length Habitat: Forest, shrubland, and inland wetlands	LC Unknown
South-western free-tailed bat	O. kitcheneri (Reardon, McKenzie, & Adams, 2014)	Southwestern Australia	Size: 5–6 cm (2 in), plus 2–4 cm (1–2 in) tail 3–4 cm (1–2 in) forearm length Habitat: Forest and shrubland	LC Unknown
Southern free-tailed bat	O. planiceps Peters, 1866	Australia	Size: 5–6 cm (2 in), plus 2–4 cm (1–2 in) tail 3–4 cm (1–2 in) forearm length Habitat: Forest and shrubland	LC Unknown

Genus Platymops – Thomas, 1906 – one species
Common name	Scientific name and subspecies	Range	Size and ecology	IUCN status and estimated population
Peters's flat-headed bat	P. setiger (Peters, 1878)	Eastern Africa	Size: 5–8 cm (2–3 in), plus 2–4 cm (1–2 in) tail 2–4 cm (1–2 in) forearm length Habitat: Savanna and rocky areas	LC Unknown

Genus Promops – Gervais, 1856 – three species
Common name	Scientific name and subspecies	Range	Size and ecology	IUCN status and estimated population
Big crested mastiff bat	P. centralis Thomas, 1915	Southern Mexico, Central America, and South America	Size: 5–10 cm (2–4 in), plus 4–7 cm (2–3 in) tail 4–6 cm (2 in) forearm length Habitat: Forest and unknown	LC Unknown
Brown mastiff bat	P. nasutus Spix, 1823	South America	Size: 6–8 cm (2–3 in), plus 4–6 cm (2 in) tail 4–6 cm (2 in) forearm length Habitat: Unknown	LC Unknown
Davison's mastiff bat	P. davisoni Thomas, 1921	Peru and Ecuador	Size: 5–8 cm (2–3 in), plus 4–6 cm (2 in) tail 4–6 cm (2 in) forearm length Habitat: Forest	DD Unknown

Genus Sauromys – Peterson, 1965 – one species
Common name	Scientific name and subspecies	Range	Size and ecology	IUCN status and estimated population
Roberts's flat-headed bat	S. petrophilus (Roberts, 1917) Five subspecies: S. p. erongensis; S. p. fitzsimonsi; S. p. haagneri; S. p. petrophilus; S. p. umbratus	Southern Africa	Size: 6–9 cm (2–4 in), plus 2–5 cm (1–2 in) tail 3–5 cm (1–2 in) forearm length Habitat: Savanna, shrubland, and rocky areas	LC Unknown

Genus Setirostris – Reardon, McKenzie, Cooper, Appleton, Carthew, & Adams, 2014 – one species
Common name	Scientific name and subspecies	Range	Size and ecology	IUCN status and estimated population
Hairy-nosed free-tailed bat	S. eleryi Reardon & McKenzie, 2008	Australia	Size: 4–5 cm (2 in), plus 2–4 cm (1–2 in) tail 3–4 cm (1–2 in) forearm length Habitat: Savanna, shrubland, and rocky areas	NT 10,000

Genus Tadarida – Rafinesque, 1814 – seven species
Common name	Scientific name and subspecies	Range	Size and ecology	IUCN status and estimated population
African giant free-tailed bat	T. ventralis (Heuglin, 1861)	Eastern Africa	Size: 9–11 cm (4 in), plus 5–7 cm (2–3 in) tail 6–7 cm (2–3 in) forearm length Habitat: Savanna and rocky areas	DD Unknown
East Asian free-tailed bat	T. insignis (Blyth, 1862)	Eastern Asia	Size: 8–11 cm (3–4 in), plus 4–6 cm (2 in) tail 5–7 cm (2–3 in) forearm length Habitat: Coastal marine, caves, grassland, and forest	DD Unknown
European free-tailed bat	T. teniotis (Rafinesque, 1814)	Southern Europe, northern Africa, western Asia, and scattered central Asia	Size: 8–9 cm (3–4 in), plus 3–6 cm (1–2 in) tail 5–7 cm (2–3 in) forearm length Habitat: Shrubland, grassland, rocky areas, caves, and desert	LC Unknown
Kenyan big-eared free-tailed bat	T. lobata Thomas, 1891	Eastern and southern Africa	Size: 7–9 cm (3–4 in), plus 4–6 cm (2 in) tail 5–7 cm (2–3 in) forearm length Habitat: Savanna and rocky areas	LC Unknown
La Touche's free-tailed bat	T. latouchei Thomas, 1920	Eastern and southeastern Asia	Size: 6–8 cm (2–3 in), plus 4–5 cm (2 in) tail 5–6 cm (2 in) forearm length Habitat: Caves and forest	EN 200
Madagascan large free-tailed bat	T. fulminans Thomas, 1903	Eastern and southern Africa and Madagascar	Size: 7–10 cm (3–4 in), plus 5–7 cm (2–3 in) tail 5–7 cm (2–3 in) forearm length Habitat: Forest, savanna, and rocky areas	LC Unknown
Mexican free-tailed bat	T. brasiliensis (Geoffroy, 1824)	North America and South America	Size: 4–7 cm (2–3 in), plus 2–5 cm (1–2 in) tail 3–5 cm (1–2 in) forearm length Habitat: Forest, rocky areas, caves, and desert	LC 10–100 million

=== Subfamily Tomopeatinae ===
Genus Tomopeas – Miller, 1900 – one species
Common name	Scientific name and subspecies	Range	Size and ecology	IUCN status and estimated population
Blunt-eared bat	T. ravus Miller, 1900	Peru	Size: 3–5 cm (1–2 in), plus 2–5 cm (1–2 in) tail 3–4 cm (1–2 in) forearm length Habitat: Caves	EN Unknown

== Sources ==
- Chernasky, Amy; Motis, Anna; Burgin, Connor, eds. (2023). All the Mammals of the World. Lynx Nature Books. ISBN 978-84-16728-66-4.
- Simmons, Nancy B. (2005). Wilson, Don E.; Reeder, DeeAnn M. (eds.). Mammal Species of the World. Vol. 1 (3rd ed.). Johns Hopkins University Press. ISBN 978-0-8018-8221-0.
- Nowak, Ronald M. (1994). Walker's Bats of the World. Johns Hopkins University Press. ISBN 978-0-8018-4986-2.
