= Mops bakarii =

Conservation status
- Data Deficient (IUCN 3.1)

Scientific classification
- Kingdom: Animalia
- Phylum: Chordata
- Class: Mammalia
- Order: Chiroptera
- Family: Molossidae
- Genus: Mops
- Species: M. bakarii

Binomial name
- Mops bakarii Stanley, 2008

Species of bat

Mops bakarii is a species of mastiff bat, described in 2008. It is endemic to Pemba Island, which lies in the Indian Ocean off the coast of Tanzania.

== Taxonomy ==
Mops bakarii was described as a new species in 2008. The holotype had been collected in 2006 in the attic of a hospital in the village of Kipangani near Ngezi Forest Reserve. Within the genus Mops it is in the subgenus Xiphonycteris. Other species in this subgenus include the Sierra Leone free-tailed bat, Peterson's free-tailed bat, the dwarf free-tailed bat, Spurrell's free-tailed bat, and the Railer bat. The eponym for the species name "bakarii" was Bakari Asseid "to recognize his significant contributions to the conservation of natural habitats and biota of Zanzibar".
