= Mops atsinanana =

Conservation status
- Least Concern (IUCN 3.1)

Scientific classification
- Kingdom: Animalia
- Phylum: Chordata
- Class: Mammalia
- Order: Chiroptera
- Family: Molossidae
- Genus: Mops
- Species: M. atsinanana

Binomial name
- Mops atsinanana Goodman, Buccas, Naidoo, Ratrimomanarivo, Taylor and Lamb, 2010

Species of mammal

Mops atsinanana is a free-tailed bat found on Madagascar. It was considered a subspecies of the little free-tailed bat until 2010. During the day, they are known to roost in man-made structures such as the roofs or attics of buildings.

== Taxonomy and etymology ==
It was described as a new species in 2010 as the result of a taxonomic split of the little free-tailed bat, Chaerephon pumilus. With the taxonomic revision, all "C. pumilus" on Madagascar were reclassified as C. atsinanana, meaning that C. pumilus range no longer includes Madagascar. The species name "atsinanana" is derived from the Malagasy word meaning "from the east."

== Description ==
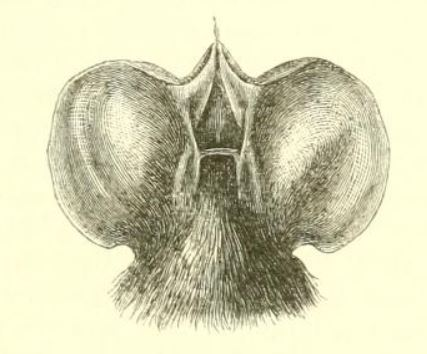
The interaural membrane in the northern free-tailed bat (dorsal view)

It is considered a relatively small member of the free-tailed bat family. Its forearm length ranges from 37–42 mm (1.5–1.7 in) long. Its ears are united by a connecting process referred to as the interaural membrane. It can be distinguished from the similar little free-tailed bat by its broader antitragus and tragus (ear). Its dorsal fur is blackish-brown, with a brown throat and dark-brown ventral fur. Some individuals have a small patch of white fur mid-venter, though this is uncommon. Its flight membranes are dark in color.

== Biology ==
It is nocturnal, roosting in sheltered places during the day. As of 2010, all known roosts were in manmade structures such as schools, churches, and houses. It is possible that its population has increased with urbanization due to the abundance of artificial roosting sites. Natural roost sites for this species possibly include caves and rock crevices, though this is not yet confirmed.

== Range and habitat ==
It is found in several sites throughout eastern Madagascar, from 0–1,100 m (0–3,609 ft) above sea level.

== Conservation ==
It is currently evaluated as least concern by the IUCN—its lowest conservation priority. This species is possibly harvested for bushmeat.
