= Niangara free-tailed bat =

Conservation status
- Data Deficient (IUCN 3.1)

Scientific classification
- Kingdom: Animalia
- Phylum: Chordata
- Class: Mammalia
- Order: Chiroptera
- Family: Molossidae
- Genus: Mops
- Species: M. niangarae

Binomial name
- Mops niangarae J.A. Allen, 1917

Species of bat

The Niangara free-tailed bat or Niangara mops bat (Mops niangarae) is a species of bat in the family Molossidae known only from its holotype. It is endemic to Democratic Republic of the Congo. Its natural habitat is either moist tropical forest or savanna.

== Taxonomy ==
The holotype of the bat was collected in Niangara in northeastern DR Congo, near the border with Sudan. The species was initially called a subspecies of both M. trevori and M. congicus. However, it was retained as an independent species following an assessment that indicated that the holotype's skull significantly differed from skulls of both M. trevori and congicus. The bat's taxonomic relationship with M. trevori is unclear.

== Habitat and distribution ==
The bat is only known to inhabit the DRC. Its area of inhabitation is 893 km^{2} (345 sq mi). It appears to roost in tree stumps.

== Conservation ==
Very little is known about the bat's habits, range, and population. Consequently, it is assessed as data-deficient.
