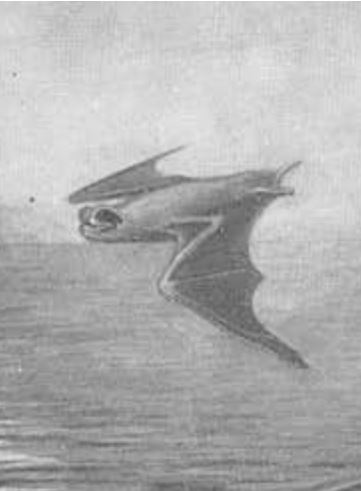

Conservation status
- Least Concern (IUCN 3.1)

Scientific classification
- Kingdom: Animalia
- Phylum: Chordata
- Class: Mammalia
- Order: Chiroptera
- Family: Molossidae
- Genus: Mops
- Species: M. demonstrator

Binomial name
- Mops demonstrator Thomas, 1903

Synonyms
- Nyctinomus demonstrator Thomas, 1903; Tadarida demonstrator (Thomas, 1903); Mops faradjius J. A. Allen, 1917; Chaerephon demonstrator (Thomas, 1903)

= Mongalla free-tailed bat =

Species of bat

The Mongalla free-tailed bat (Mops demonstrator) is a species of bat in the family Molossidae. It is found in Burkina Faso, Cameroon, Democratic Republic of the Congo, Ivory Coast, Ghana, Kenya, Mali, Sudan, and Uganda. Its natural habitats are dry savanna, moist savanna, and subtropical or tropical seasonally wet or flooded lowland grassland.

== Taxonomy and systematics ==
The Mongalla free-tailed bat was first described as Nyctinomus demonstrator by the British mammalogist Oldfield Thomas in 1903 on the basis of an adult male specimen collected from Mongalla, South Sudan. It was moved to the genus Tadarida in 1914 when Nyctinomus was lumped with the former by Marcus Ward Lyon Jr. In 1983, Patricia Freeman raised Mops from a subgenus within Tadarida to a full genus and included the Mongalla free-tailed bat within it. The species is also called the Mongalla mops bat and Mongallan mops bat. It has no recognized subspecies.

Within its genus, the Mongalla free-tailed bat is placed in the subgenus Mops. Within the genus, it is most closely related to the white-bellied free-tailed bat, which has sometimes been treated as a subspecies of the present species. Its relationship to other species in the genus are unclear, with a 2015 morphological study by Renato Gregorin and Andrea Cirranello finding relationships within Mops to be uncertain.

== Status ==
The Mongalla free-tailed bat is listed as being of least concern by the International Union for Conservation of Nature. However, its population is currently thought to be decreasing. It occurs in some protected areas, such as the Garamba National Park in the Democratic Republic of the Congo. It is threatened by habitat loss caused by the cutting of large trees it roosts in, along with desertification in the north of its range.
