= Mops pusillus =

Conservation status
- Vulnerable (IUCN 3.1)

Scientific classification
- Kingdom: Animalia
- Phylum: Chordata
- Class: Mammalia
- Order: Chiroptera
- Family: Molossidae
- Genus: Mops
- Species: M. pusillus

Binomial name
- Mops pusillus Miller, 1902

Synonyms
- Nyctinomus pusillus Miller, 1902

Species of bat

Mops pusillus is a species of bat in the family Molossidae. It is found on islands off the coast of east Africa.

== Taxonomy ==
This bat was originally considered a distinct species, before being relegated to a synonym of M. pumilus. However, the presumed Seychelles populations of M. pumilus were discovered to be smaller than the ones in Kenya and Madagascar, leading to the resurrection of the name as a distinct species.

== Description ==
The bat has a blackish-brown dorsum, brown throat, and dark brown chest. It has a dark brown venter, with a small white mid-ventral patch in rare cases. Comorian populations of the bat have a distinct whitish or beige strip of hairs at the base of the wings.

There is a possibility of inter-island seasonal variation in reproduction.

== Habitat and distribution ==
The bat is found in the Comoro Islands and Seychelles.

On Comoros, it was not observed roosting in natural sites, but instead mostly in the attics of public buildings. Moreover, the bats were observed to roost in older-style colonial buildings, but not in modern buildings. Their roosting may also be seasonal, as they have been observed abandoning roosts during the cold season.
