= Grandidier's free-tailed bat =

Conservation status
- Least Concern (IUCN 3.1)

Scientific classification
- Kingdom: Animalia
- Phylum: Chordata
- Class: Mammalia
- Order: Chiroptera
- Family: Molossidae
- Genus: Mops
- Species: M. leucogaster

Binomial name
- Mops leucogaster (Grandidier, 1869)

Synonyms
- Tadarida leucogaster Grandidier, 1869; Chaerephon pumilus Cretzschmar, 1826

Species of bat

Grandidier's free-tailed bat (Mops leucogaster) is a species of bat in the family Molossidae. It is endemic to Madagascar. Its natural habitats are subtropical or tropical dry forests and dry savanna. It has at times been considered synonymous with the little free-tailed bat.

== Classical ring species hypothesis ==
A ring species occurs when two populations that are connected by a geographic ring of populations that can interbreed but do not interbreed despite living in the same region. Upon migrating to the Comoros, Grandidier's free-tailed bat and C. pusillius became sympatric. There is evidence of isolation between the two populations further restricting gene flow.
