= Russet free-tailed bat =

Conservation status
- Data Deficient (IUCN 3.1)

Scientific classification
- Kingdom: Animalia
- Phylum: Chordata
- Class: Mammalia
- Order: Chiroptera
- Family: Molossidae
- Genus: Mops
- Species: M. russatus

Binomial name
- Mops russatus J.A. Allen, 1917

Synonyms
- Chaerephon russata

Species of bat

The russet free-tailed bat (Mops russatus) is a species of bat in the family Molossidae. It is found in Cameroon, Democratic Republic of the Congo, Ghana, and Kenya. Its natural habitat is subtropical or tropical moist lowland forests.
