= Lappet-eared free-tailed bat =

Conservation status
- Least Concern (IUCN 3.1)

Scientific classification
- Kingdom: Animalia
- Phylum: Chordata
- Class: Mammalia
- Order: Chiroptera
- Family: Molossidae
- Genus: Mops
- Species: M. major

Binomial name
- Mops major (Trouessart, 1897)

Synonyms
- Nyctinomus pumilus major Trouessart, 1897; Tadarida (Chaerephon) major Trouessart, 1897

Species of bat

The lappet-eared free-tailed bat (Mops major) is a species of bat in the family Molossidae. It is found in Benin, Burkina Faso, Democratic Republic of the Congo, Ivory Coast, Ghana, Guinea, Kenya, Liberia, Mali, Niger, Nigeria, Sudan, Tanzania, Togo, and Uganda. Its natural habitats are dry savanna and moist savanna.

== Taxonomy and etymology ==
It was species description described in 1897 by French zoologist Édouard Louis Trouessart. Trouessart named it a subspecies of the little free-tailed bat (Chaerephon pumilus), which at the time was Nyctinomus pumilus. Therefore, its initial trinomen was Nyctinomus pumilus major. George Edward Dobson had previously written about the specimen used to describe the subspecies, at the time saying, "I hesitate to describe it as the type of a new species." Its species name "major" is of Middle English origin, meaning "greater." Trouessart likely chose this name because Dobson wrote that it was similar to the little free-tailed bat, but "considerably larger."

The holotype was collected by Francis Galton during his expedition to Egypt. Dobson wrote that the holotype had been collected at the "Cataract of the Nile," though it is unclear which of the six cataracts he was referring to.

== Description ==
In writing about the species, Dobson described it as similar in appearance to the little free-tailed bat. However, he stated that it was "considerably larger." It has very short, dark brown fur; the fur of its back is darker than its ventral side. Its flight membranes are whitish in color.
