= Malagasy white-bellied free-tailed bat =

Conservation status
- Least Concern (IUCN 3.1)

Scientific classification
- Kingdom: Animalia
- Phylum: Chordata
- Class: Mammalia
- Order: Chiroptera
- Family: Molossidae
- Genus: Mops
- Species: M. leucostigma

Binomial name
- Mops leucostigma Allen, 1918
- Malagasy white-bellied free-tailed bat range

Species of bat

The Malagasy white-bellied free-tailed bat (Mops leucostigma) is a species of bat in the family Molossidae. It is endemic to Madagascar.
