= Petramops =

Petramops Temporal range: Lower Miocene

Scientific classification
- Kingdom: Animalia
- Phylum: Chordata
- Class: Mammalia
- Order: Chiroptera
- Family: Molossidae
- Genus: †Petramops; Hand, 1990
- Species: †P. creaseri

Binomial name
- †Petramops creaseri Hand et al. 1990

Extinct species of bat

Petramops creaseri is a species of molossid bat discovered in Miocene fossil deposits at the Riversleigh sites.

== Taxonomy ==
The species was described in 1990 by Suzanne J. Hand, a researcher at the Riversleigh World Heritage Area. The author separated the species as a new genus, Petramops within the Molossidae family of microchiropterans. The holotype, a partial dentary, was discovered at the Gotham City site at Riversleigh. The genus is masculine, and combines the Latin petrus for rock with mops, a common suffix of chiropteran genera. The specific epithet honours Phil Creaser, noted for his contributions in support of the research at Riverleigh.

== Description ==
Petramops was a molossid bat not closely related to modern Australian species, and apparently part of a basal group involved in the earliest dispersal of the family. It was a long distance flyer, which may have facilitated its colonisation of the Australian region before other molossids, perhaps in the early Miocene. The species is described by characteristics of the dentition that most closely resemble the genus Rhizomops, found in the Americas.

The type material was a lower jaw with some intact teeth, with other teeth supplementing Hand's description and diagnosis. Other specimens, including post-cranial material, were later identified as the same species. This species is presumed to have foraged over, and at the edges of, the dense rainforest that existed in the Miocene.
