= Javan mastiff bat =

Conservation status
- Data Deficient (IUCN 3.1)

Scientific classification
- Kingdom: Animalia
- Phylum: Chordata
- Class: Mammalia
- Order: Chiroptera
- Family: Molossidae
- Genus: Otomops
- Species: O. formosus

Binomial name
- Otomops formosus Chasen, 1939

Species of bat

The Javan mastiff bat (Otomops formosus) is a species of bat in the family Molossidae that is endemic to Indonesia.
