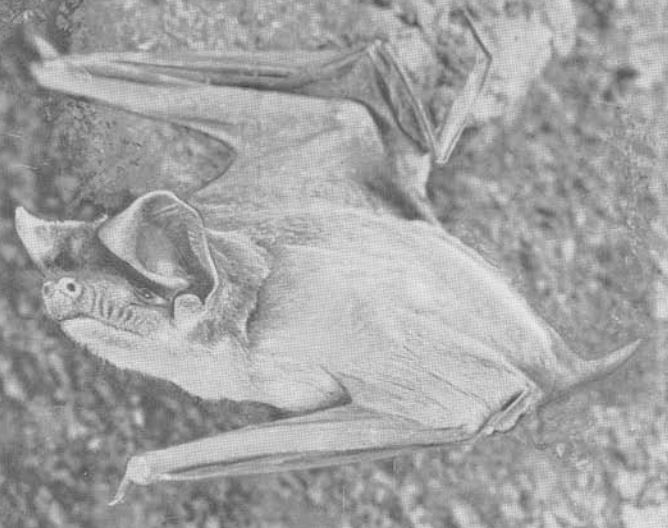
- Holotype from 1917

Conservation status
- Data Deficient (IUCN 3.1)

Scientific classification
- Kingdom: Animalia
- Phylum: Chordata
- Class: Mammalia
- Order: Chiroptera
- Family: Molossidae
- Genus: Mops
- Species: M. trevori

Binomial name
- Mops trevori J.A. Allen, 1917

Synonyms
- Tadarida trevori J.A. Allen, 1917; Mops congicus J.A. Allen, 1917

= Trevor's free-tailed bat =

Species of bat

The Trevor's free-tailed bat (Mops trevori) is a species of bat in the family Molossidae. It is found in Central and West Africa. Its natural habitats are subtropical or tropical dry forests and moist savanna.

== Taxonomy and etymology ==
It was described as a new species in 1917 by American zoologist Joel Asaph Allen. The holotype was collected by James Chapin in Faradje. The eponym for the species name "trevori" was John Bond Trevor. Trevor was a trustee of the American Museum of Natural History, which employed Allen, as well as Chairman of the Committee on African Exploration.

== Description ==
Its forearm length is 51–55 mm (2.0–2.2 in). Its flight membranes are dark brown and its fur is sepia brown, yellowish-brown, or a pale, rusty brown.

== Range and habitat ==
Its range includes parts of the Central African Republic, the Democratic Republic of the Congo, Ivory Coast, Ghana, Guinea, Nigeria, South Sudan, and Uganda.

== Conservation ==
As of 2019, it is evaluated as a data deficient species by the IUCN. Overall, little is known about its biology and ecology. Its population is believed to be decreasing.
