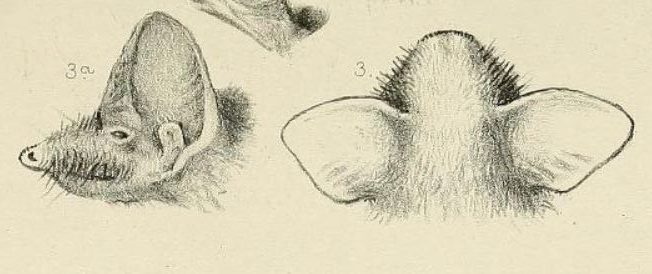

Conservation status
- Least Concern (IUCN 3.1)

Scientific classification
- Kingdom: Animalia
- Phylum: Chordata
- Class: Mammalia
- Order: Chiroptera
- Family: Molossidae
- Genus: Platymops; Thomas, 1906
- Species: P. setiger

Binomial name
- Platymops setiger (Peters, 1878)

Synonyms
- Mormopterus setiger Peters, 1878

= Peters's flat-headed bat =

Species of bat

Peters's flat-headed bat (Platymops setiger) is a species of bat in the family Molossidae and the monotypic genus Platymops. It is found in Ethiopia, Kenya, and South Sudan. Its natural habitats are dry savanna and rocky areas.
