= Sulawesi free-tailed bat =

Conservation status
- Data Deficient (IUCN 3.1)

Scientific classification
- Kingdom: Animalia
- Phylum: Chordata
- Class: Mammalia
- Order: Chiroptera
- Family: Molossidae
- Genus: Mops
- Species: M. sarasinorum

Binomial name
- Mops sarasinorum (Meyer, 1899)
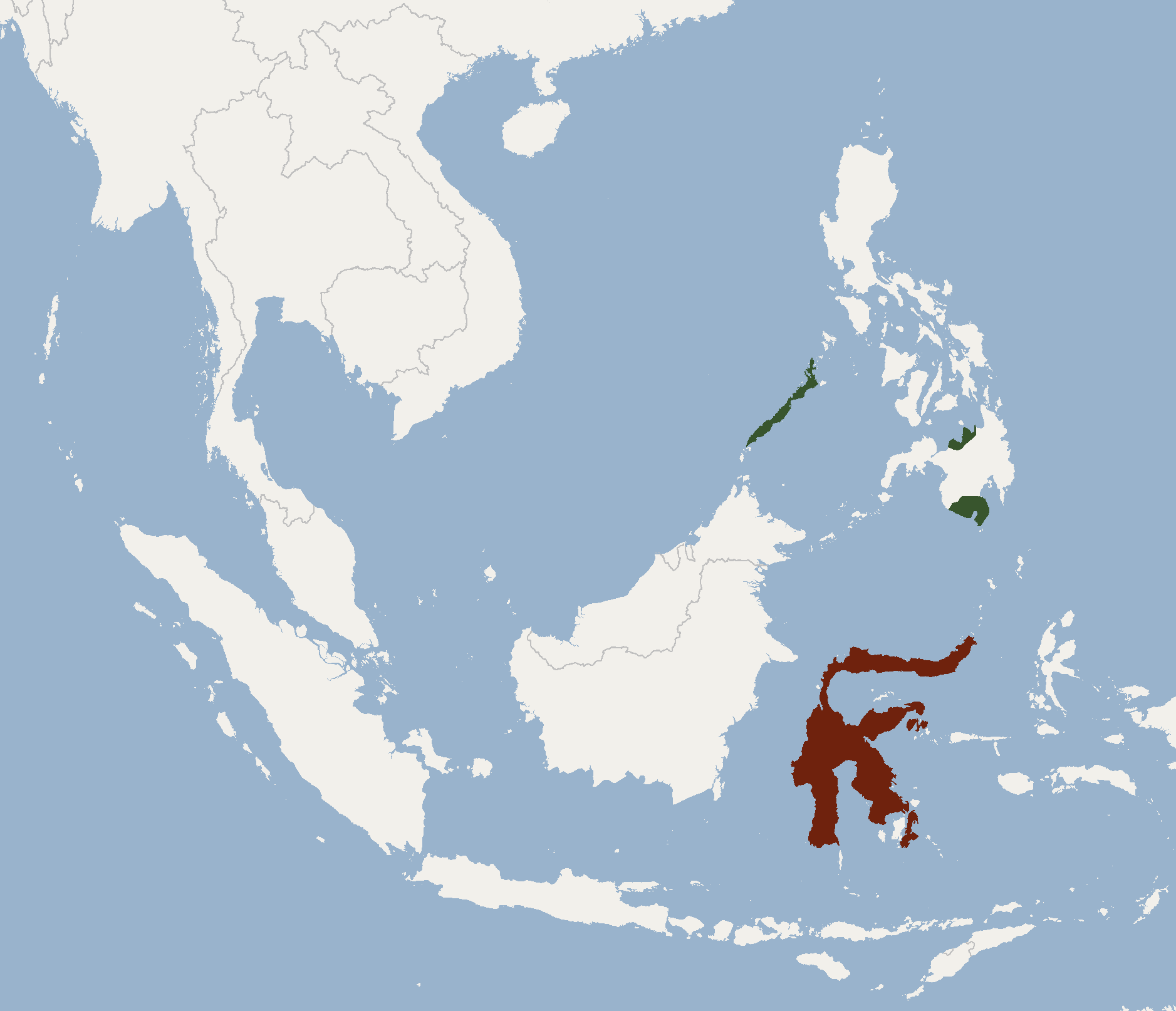

Synonyms
- Nyctinomus sarasinorum Meyer, 1899; Tadarida sarasinorum (Meyer, 1899)

Species of bat

The Sulawesi free-tailed bat (Mops sarasinorum) is a species of bat in the family Molossidae. It is found in Indonesia and the Philippines.

== Taxonomy and etymology ==
It was described as a new species in 1899 by German biologist Christian Erich Hermann von Meyer. Von Meyer placed it in the now-defunct genus Nyctinomus with a binomial of N. sarasinorum. The eponym for the species name "sarasinorum" was Paul and Fritz Sarasin, a pair of Swiss cousins who conducted a research expedition in Sulawesi.

== Description ==
It has a forearm length of approximately 40 mm (1.6 in). Its fur color is variable, with individuals documented with blackish brown, blackish chestnut, or chesnut-brown. Individuals weigh approximately 19.7 g (0.69 oz).

== Range and habitat ==
It is native to Southeast Asia where it is found in Indonesia and the Philippines. It has been found at elevations up to 1,000 m (3,300 ft) above sea level.

== Conservation ==
As of 2016, it is evaluated as a data deficient species by the IUCN.
