= Mantled mastiff bat =

Conservation status
- Data Deficient (IUCN 3.1)

Scientific classification
- Kingdom: Animalia
- Phylum: Chordata
- Class: Mammalia
- Order: Chiroptera
- Family: Molossidae
- Genus: Otomops
- Species: O. secundus

Binomial name
- Otomops secundus Hayman, 1952

Species of bat

The mantled mastiff bat (Otomops secundus) is a species of bat in the Molossidae family endemic to Papua New Guinea.
