= Malayan free-tailed bat =

Conservation status
- Near Threatened (IUCN 3.1)

Scientific classification
- Kingdom: Animalia
- Phylum: Chordata
- Class: Mammalia
- Order: Chiroptera
- Family: Molossidae
- Genus: Mops
- Species: M. mops

Binomial name
- Mops mops (Blainville, 1840)
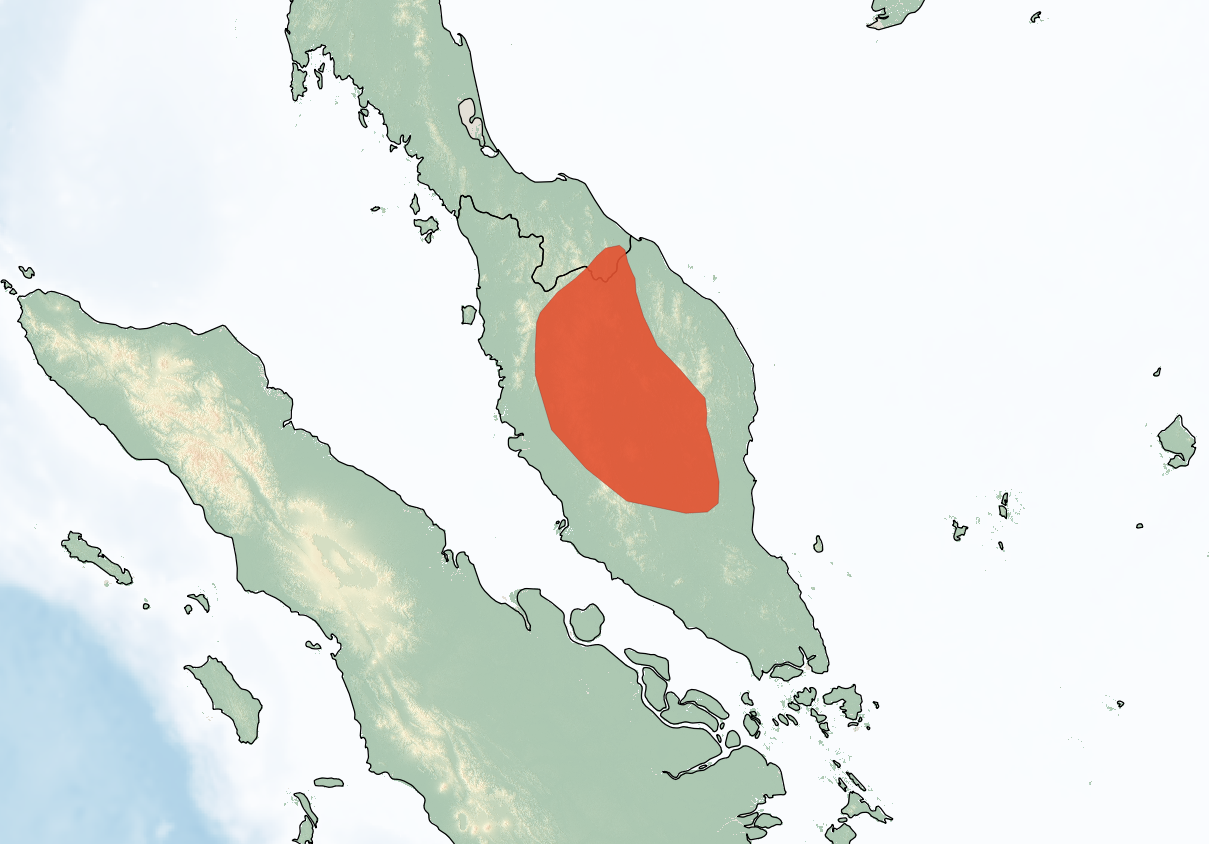

Species of bat

The Malayan free-tailed bat (Mops mops) is a species of bat in the family Molossidae. It is found in Indonesia and Malaysia.
