= Johnstone's mastiff bat =

Conservation status
- Data Deficient (IUCN 3.1)

Scientific classification
- Kingdom: Animalia
- Phylum: Chordata
- Class: Mammalia
- Order: Chiroptera
- Family: Molossidae
- Genus: Otomops
- Species: O. johnstonei

Binomial name
- Otomops johnstonei Kitchener, How & Maryanto, 1992
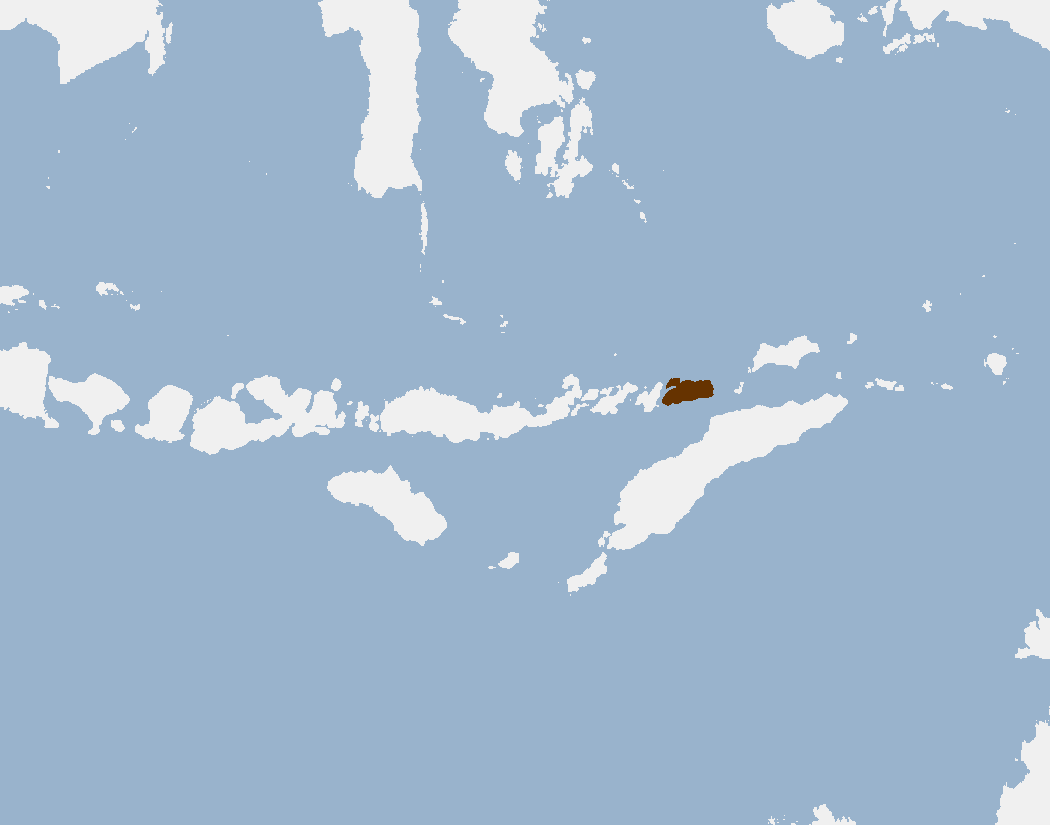

Species of bat

Johnstone's mastiff bat (Otomops johnstonei) is a species of bat in the Molossidae family endemic to Indonesia.
