= Solomons mastiff bat =

Conservation status
- Endangered (IUCN 3.1)

Scientific classification
- Kingdom: Animalia
- Phylum: Chordata
- Class: Mammalia
- Order: Chiroptera
- Family: Molossidae
- Genus: Mops
- Species: M. solomonis

Binomial name
- Mops solomonis Troughton, 1931

Species of bat

The Solomons mastiff bat (Mops solomonis) is a species of bat in the family Molossidae. It is endemic to the Solomon Islands.

== Taxonomy and etymology ==
It was described as a new species by Australian mammalogist Ellis Le Geyt Troughton in 1931. Troughton likely chose the species name "solomonis" because this species was first discovered on the Solomon Islands. It is sometimes classified as a subspecies of the northern freetail bat, Mops jobensis.

The genus Chaerephon was formerly considered a subgenus of or synonymous with the genus Tadarida, meaning that this species has been known as Tadarida jobensis solomonis or Tadarida solomonis.

== Description ==
Its forearm is 40.5–45 mm (1.59–1.77 in). In total, its head and body are 63–68 mm (2.5–2.7 in) long, while its tail is 35–36 mm (1.4–1.4 in) long. Its fur is a rich, auburn brown, with white hairs interspersed infrequently. Its tragus is lobed and broad at the tip.

== Range and habitat ==
Its range is currently known to include Choiseul Island and Santa Isabel Island, both of which are part of the Solomon Islands.

== Conservation ==
It is evaluated as endangered by the IUCN.
