= Dwarf free-tailed bat =

Conservation status
- Least Concern (IUCN 3.1)

Scientific classification
- Kingdom: Animalia
- Phylum: Chordata
- Class: Mammalia
- Order: Chiroptera
- Family: Molossidae
- Genus: Mops
- Species: M. nanulus

Binomial name
- Mops nanulus J.A. Allen, 1917

Species of bat

The dwarf free-tailed bat (Mops nanulus) is a species of bat in the family Molossidae. It is found in Cameroon, Democratic Republic of the Congo, Ivory Coast, Ethiopia, Ghana, Guinea, Kenya, Nigeria, Sierra Leone, South Sudan, and Uganda. Its natural habitats are subtropical or tropical dry forests and subtropical or tropical moist lowland forests.

== Taxonomy ==
It was described as a new species in 1917 by American zoologist, Joel Asaph Allen. The holotype was collected in Niangara, Democratic Republic of the Congo by Herbert Lang and James Chapin.

== Description ==
It has a forearm length of 27.3–28.7 mm (1.07–1.13 in).
