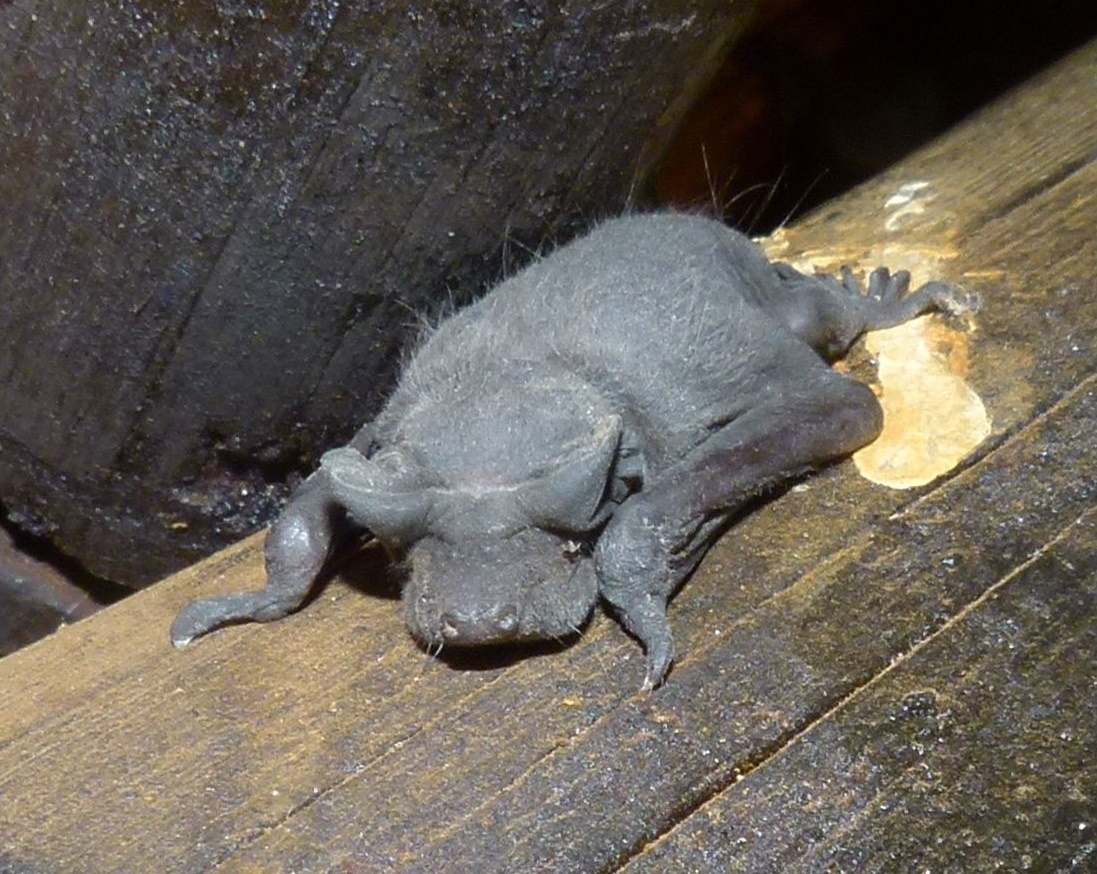
- Angolan free-tailed bat (Mops condylurus)

Scientific classification
- Kingdom: Animalia
- Phylum: Chordata
- Class: Mammalia
- Order: Chiroptera
- Family: Molossidae
- Genus: Mops; Lesson, 1842

Type species
- Mops indicus Lesson, 1842

Species
- See text

= Mops (bat) =

Genus of bats

Mops (mastiff bats or free-tailed bats) is a genus of bats in the family Molossidae. Molecular sequence data indicates that Mops and Chaerephon are not monophyletic taxa. However, the grouping of Chaerephon and Mops was found to be monophyletic when excluding C. jobimena.

Species within this genus are:

Genus Mops - greater mastiff bats

- Duke of Abruzzi's free-tailed bat, Mops aloysiisabaudiae
- Ansorge's free-tailed bat, Mops ansorgei
- Mops atsinanana
- Bakari's free-tailed bat, Mops bakarii
- Gland-tailed free-tailed bat, Mops bemmeleni
- Spotted free-tailed bat, Mops bivittatus
- Sierra Leone free-tailed bat, Mops brachypterus
- Fijian mastiff bat, Mops bregullae
- Chapin's free-tailed bat, Mops chapini
- Angolan free-tailed bat, Mops condylurus
- Medje free-tailed bat, Mops congicus
- Mongalla free-tailed bat, Mops demonstrator
- Gallagher's free-tailed bat, Mops gallagheri
- Northern freetail bat, Mops jobensis
- Mops jobimena
- Northern free-tailed bat, Mops johorensis
- Grandidier's free-tailed bat, Mops leucogaster
- Malagasy white-bellied free-tailed bat, Mops leucostigma
- Lappet-eared free-tailed bat, Mops major
- Midas free-tailed bat, Mops midas
- Malayan free-tailed bat, Mops mops
- Dwarf free-tailed bat, Mops nanulus
- Niangara free-tailed bat, Mops niangarae
- Nigerian free-tailed bat Mops nigeriae
- White-bellied free-tailed bat, Mops niveiventer
- Peterson's free-tailed bat, Mops petersoni
- Wrinkle-lipped free-tailed bat, Mops plicatus
- Little free-tailed bat, Mops pumilus
- Mops pusillus
- Russet free-tailed bat, Mops russatus
- Sulawesi free-tailed bat, Mops sarasinorum
- Solomons mastiff bat, Mops solomonis
- Spurrell's free-tailed bat, Mops spurrelli
- Railer bat, Mops thersites
- São Tomé free-tailed bat, Mops tomensis
- Trevor's free-tailed bat, Mops trevori

== Literature cited ==
- Nowak, Ronald (1991). Walker's Mammals of the World, Fifth Edition. The Johns Hopkins University Press. ISBN 0-8018-3970-X.
- Simmons, N.B. (2005). "Order Chiroptera". In Wilson, D.E.; Reeder, D.M (eds.). Mammal Species of the World: A Taxonomic and Geographic Reference (3rd ed.). Johns Hopkins University Press. pp. 312–529. ISBN 978-0-8018-8221-0. OCLC 62265494.
- Stanley, W.T. (2008). "A new species of Mops (Molossidae) from Pemba Island, Tanzania". Acta Chiropterologica. 10 (2): 183–192. doi:10.3161/150811008X414773.
