= Gland-tailed free-tailed bat =

Conservation status
- Least Concern (IUCN 3.1)

Scientific classification
- Kingdom: Animalia
- Phylum: Chordata
- Class: Mammalia
- Order: Chiroptera
- Family: Molossidae
- Genus: Mops
- Species: M. bemmeleni

Binomial name
- Mops bemmeleni (Jentink, 1879)

Synonyms
- Nyctinomus bemmeleni Jentink, 1879; Tadarida bemmeleni Jentink, 1879

Species of bat

The gland-tailed free-tailed bat (Mops bemmeleni) is a species of bat in the family Molossidae. Its natural habitats are subtropical or tropical moist montane forests, dry savanna, and caves.

== Taxonomy and etymology ==
It was described as a new species in 1879 by Dutch zoologist Fredericus Anna Jentink. Jentink placed it in the now-defunct genus Nyctinomus, with the name Nyctinomus bemmeleni. The eponym for the species name "bemmeleni" was Dutch naturalist Adriaan Anthoni van Bemmelen, who presented the holotype to the Leyden Museum where Jentink was curator.

== Description ==
Its dorsal fur is a dark, smoky brown while its ventral fur is a yellowish brown. Its upper lip is very wrinkled. Its tragus is very small and triangular. The males have a gular gland. Its dental formula is 2.1.2.34.1.2.3 for a total of 36 teeth.

== Range and habitat ==
It is found in several countries in West and Central Africa, including Cameroon, Democratic Republic of the Congo, Ivory Coast, Guinea, Kenya, Liberia, Rwanda, Sierra Leone, South Sudan, Sudan, Tanzania, and Uganda. It has not been documented at elevations greater than 1,700 m (5,600 ft) above sea level.

== Conservation ==
It is evaluated as least concern by the IUCN. It meets the criteria for this designation because it has a large geographic range; its population is presumably large; its range includes protected areas; and it is not likely to be experiencing a drastic population decline.
