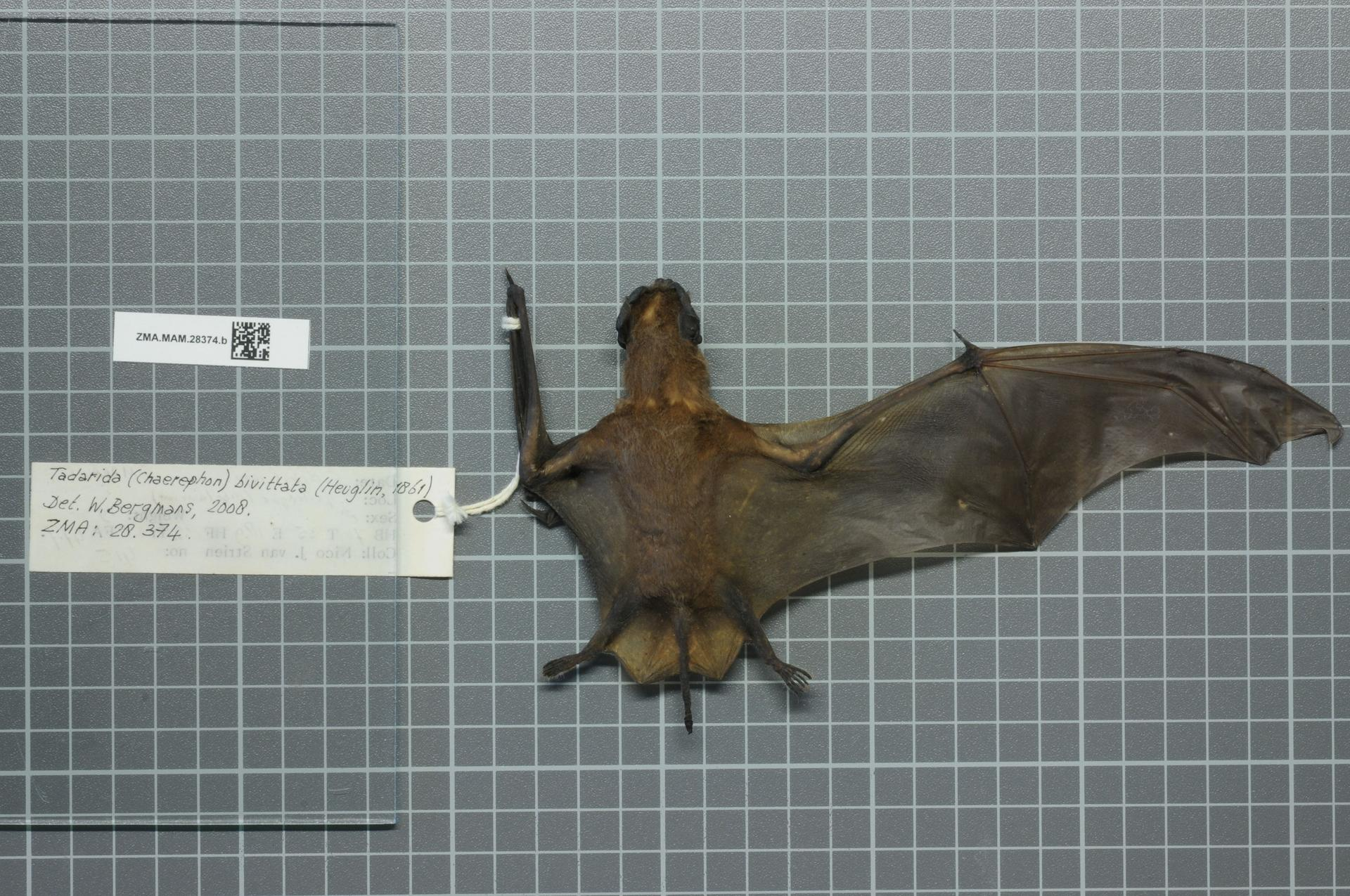

Conservation status
- Least Concern (IUCN 3.1)

Scientific classification
- Kingdom: Animalia
- Phylum: Chordata
- Class: Mammalia
- Order: Chiroptera
- Family: Molossidae
- Genus: Mops
- Species: M. bivittatus

Binomial name
- Mops bivittatus (Heuglin, 1861)

= Spotted free-tailed bat =

Species of bat

The spotted free-tailed bat (Mops bivittatus) is a species of bat in the family Molossidae. It is found in Burundi, Djibouti, Eritrea, Ethiopia, Kenya, Mozambique, Rwanda, South Sudan, Tanzania, Uganda, Zambia, and Zimbabwe. Its natural habitats are dry savanna, moist savanna, and rocky areas.
