= Madagascar free-tailed bat =

Conservation status
- Least Concern (IUCN 3.1)

Scientific classification
- Domain: Eukaryota
- Kingdom: Animalia
- Phylum: Chordata
- Class: Mammalia
- Order: Chiroptera
- Family: Molossidae
- Genus: Otomops
- Species: O. madagascariensis

Binomial name
- Otomops madagascariensis Dorst, 1953

Species of bat

The Madagascar free-tailed bat or Malagasy giant mastiff bat (Otomops madagascariensis) is a species of free-tailed bat formerly included as a subspecies of the large-eared free-tailed bat, but that was later considered to be a distinct, Malagasy species. The Madagascar free-tailed bat is endemic to northern, western, and southern Madagascar.

The Madagascar free-tailed bat is listed as Least Concern by the IUCN Red List due to its widespread distribution in Madagascar. Threats to it are unclear and more research is needed into the possible disturbance of its roost sites. The species roosts in one cave that is considered to be fady, or taboo, and it has been recorded in five protected areas: Parc National du Tsingy de Bemaraha, Parc National de Namoroka, Parc National d’Isalo, Réserve Spéciale d’Ankarana and Réserve Spéciale d’Analamerana. There are nine currently known roosting colonies, and all are in areas that receive some sort of protection by Madagascar. The population of the Madagascar free-tailed bat is unknown.

The Madagascar free-tailed bat is supposed to be an obligate cave dweller and roosts in areas with sandstone and limestone outcrops. The caves where the species lived in Réserve Spéciale d’Ankarana were all associated with cool temperatures, high elevation, and a close proximity to water. The diet of the Madagascar free-tailed bat consists mostly of butterflies and beetles, and the foraging habitats are not believed to be associated with an intact forest.
