= Kenyan big-eared free-tailed bat =

Conservation status
- Least Concern (IUCN 3.1)

Scientific classification
- Kingdom: Animalia
- Phylum: Chordata
- Class: Mammalia
- Order: Chiroptera
- Family: Molossidae
- Genus: Tadarida
- Species: T. lobata

Binomial name
- Tadarida lobata Thomas, 1891

Species of bat

The Kenyan big-eared free-tailed bat (Tadarida lobata) is a species of bat in the family Molossidae. It is found in Kenya and Zimbabwe. Its natural habitat is dry savanna.
