= Peterson's free-tailed bat =

Conservation status
- Near Threatened (IUCN 3.1)

Scientific classification
- Kingdom: Animalia
- Phylum: Chordata
- Class: Mammalia
- Order: Chiroptera
- Family: Molossidae
- Genus: Mops
- Species: M. petersoni

Binomial name
- Mops petersoni El Rayah, 1981

Synonyms
- Tadarida petersoni El Rayah, 1981

Species of bat

Peterson's free-tailed bat (Mops petersoni) is a species of bat in the family Molossidae. It is found in Cameroon and Ghana, and its natural habitats are subtropical or tropical dry forest and subtropical or tropical moist lowland forest.
