= White-bellied free-tailed bat =

Conservation status
- Least Concern (IUCN 3.1)

Scientific classification
- Kingdom: Animalia
- Phylum: Chordata
- Class: Mammalia
- Order: Chiroptera
- Family: Molossidae
- Genus: Mops
- Species: M. niveiventer

Binomial name
- Mops niveiventer Cabrera & Ruxton, 1926

Species of bat

The white-bellied free-tailed bat (Mops niveiventer) is a species of bat in the family Molossidae. It is found in Angola, the Democratic Republic of the Congo, and Zambia. Its natural habitats are subtropical or tropical moist lowland forests and moist savanna.
