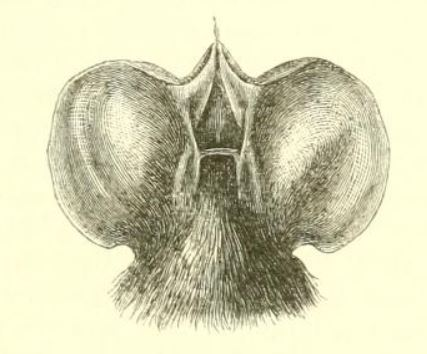
- Ears of the Northern free-tailed bat as seen from the back

Conservation status
- Vulnerable (IUCN 3.1)

Scientific classification
- Kingdom: Animalia
- Phylum: Chordata
- Class: Mammalia
- Order: Chiroptera
- Family: Molossidae
- Genus: Mops
- Species: M. johorensis

Binomial name
- Mops johorensis (Dobson, 1873)
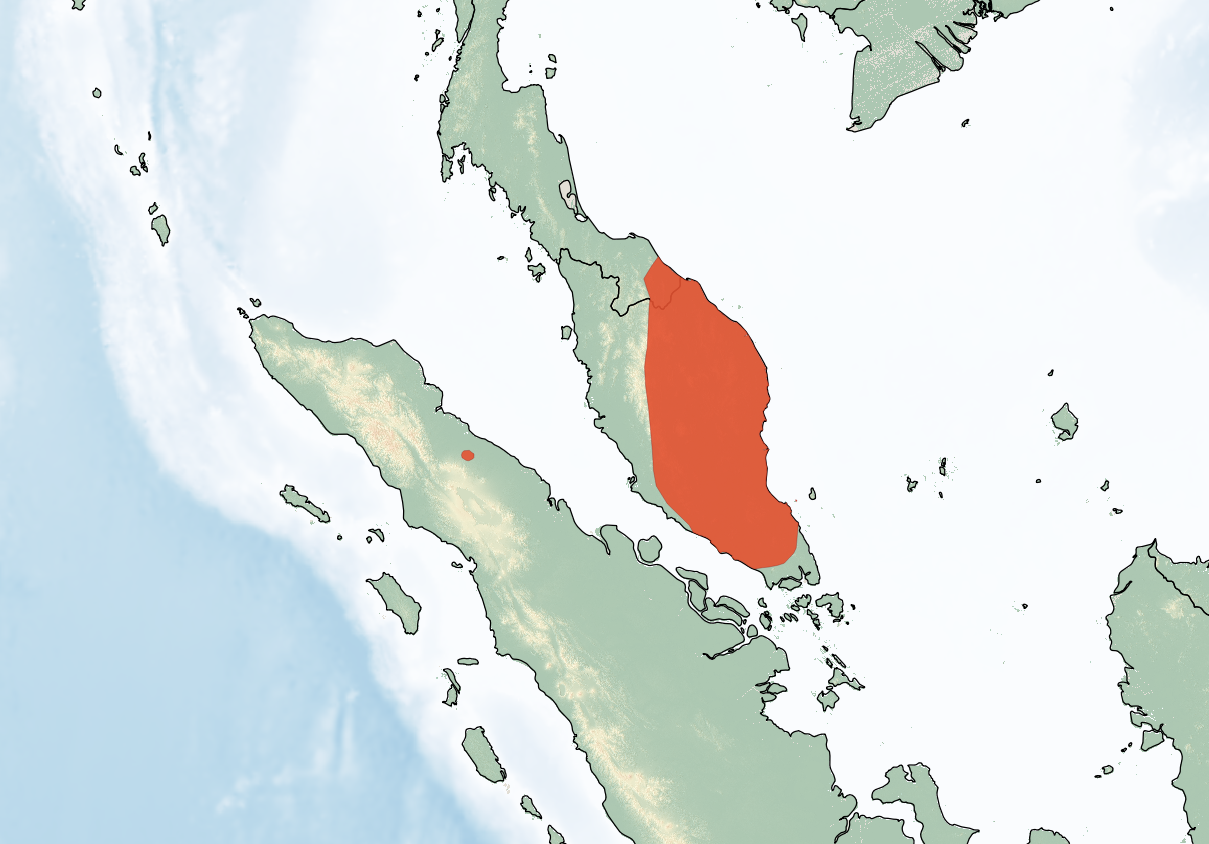

= Northern free-tailed bat =

Species of bat

The northern free-tailed bat (Mops johorensis) is a species of bat in the family Molossidae. It is found in Indonesia and Malaysia.

== Taxonomy and etymology ==
It was described as a new species in 1873 by Irish zoologist George Edward Dobson. Dobson had obtained the holotype from James Wood-Mason. Dobson initially placed it in the genus Molossus and the subgenus Nyctinomus, with a scientific name of Molossus (Nyctinomus) johorensis. Its species name "johorensis" is Latin for "belonging to Johor." Johor is a state in Malaysia; the holotype was collected there.

== Description ==
Its ears are large and round. Its tragi are small and squarish in shape. Its ears are connected to each other by a band of tissue called the interaural membrane. As a free-tailed bat, its tail extends beyond the uropatagium. Its dental formula is 2.1.2.34.1.2.3, for a total of 36 teeth.

== Conservation ==
It is currently listed as vulnerable by the IUCN. It meets the criteria for this designation because its population have declined by more than 30% from 2004–2014.
