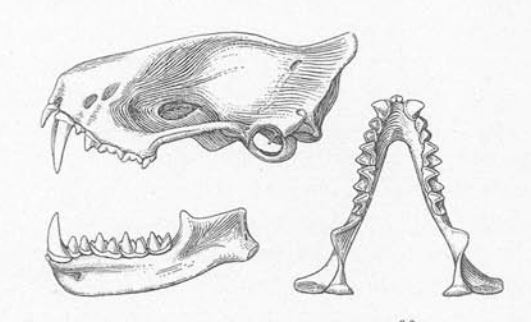

Conservation status
- Least Concern (IUCN 3.1)

Scientific classification
- Kingdom: Animalia
- Phylum: Chordata
- Class: Mammalia
- Order: Chiroptera
- Family: Molossidae
- Genus: Mops
- Species: M. thersites

Binomial name
- Mops thersites (Thomas, 1903)

Synonyms
- Nyctinomus thersites Thomas, 1903; Tadarida thersites Thomas, 1903

= Railer bat =

Species of bat

The Railer bat (Mops thersites) is a species of bat in the family Molossidae. It is found in Cameroon, Central African Republic, Republic of the Congo, Democratic Republic of the Congo, Ivory Coast, Equatorial Guinea, Gabon, Ghana, Guinea, Kenya, Liberia, Nigeria, Rwanda, Sierra Leone, and Uganda. Its natural habitats are subtropical or tropical dry forests and subtropical or tropical moist lowland forests.

One of the unique features of the Molossolid bats such as the railer bat is that they have two sets of parotid glands. This is uncommon as most species of bats have two sets of submandibular glands.
