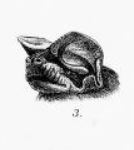

Conservation status
- Least Concern (IUCN 3.1)

Scientific classification
- Kingdom: Animalia
- Phylum: Chordata
- Class: Mammalia
- Order: Chiroptera
- Family: Molossidae
- Genus: Mops
- Species: M. brachypterus

Binomial name
- Mops brachypterus (Peters, 1852)

= Sierra Leone free-tailed bat =

Species of bat

The Sierra Leone free-tailed bat (Mops brachypterus) is a species of bat in the family Molossidae. It is found in Cameroon, Ivory Coast, Equatorial Guinea, Gabon, Ghana, Guinea, Kenya, Liberia, Mozambique, Nigeria, Sierra Leone, Tanzania, Togo, and possibly the Central African Republic, the Republic of the Congo, and the Democratic Republic of the Congo. Its natural habitats are subtropical or tropical dry forests and subtropical or tropical moist lowland forests.
