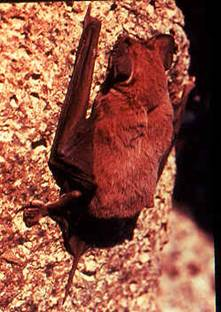
- Unidentified molossid: Note that the tail extends beyond the uropatagium

Scientific classification
- Kingdom: Animalia
- Phylum: Chordata
- Class: Mammalia
- Order: Chiroptera
- Superfamily: Vespertilionoidea
- Family: Molossidae; Gervais in de Castelnau, 1855

Type genus
- Molossus Geoffroy, 1805

Subfamilies
- Molossinae; Tomopeatinae
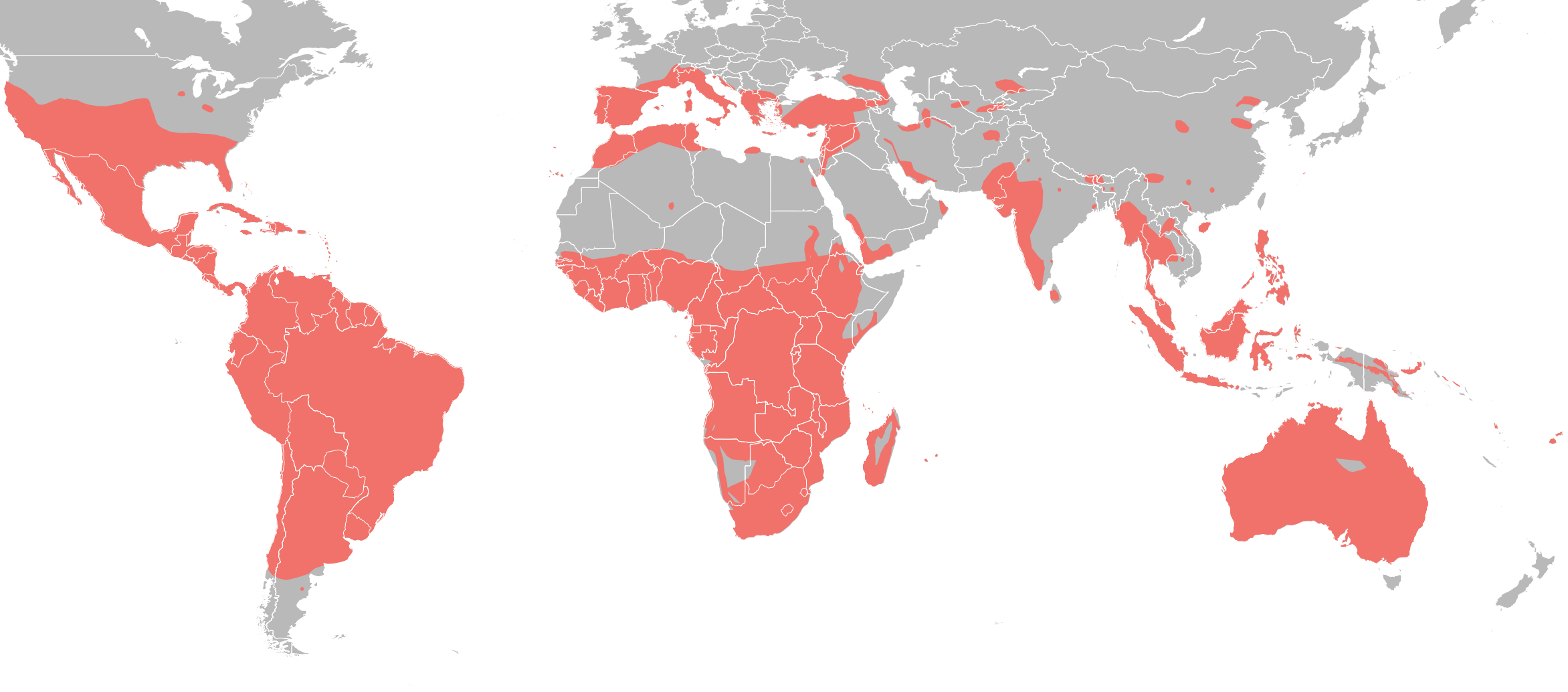
- Molossidae distribution

= Free-tailed bat =

Free-tailed bats Temporal range: Late Eocene to recent

Family of bats

The Molossidae, or free-tailed bats, are a family of bats within the order Chiroptera. Molossidae is the fourth-largest family of bats, containing about 110 species as of 2012. They are generally quite robust, and consist of many strong-flying forms with relatively long and narrow wings with wrinkled lips shared through their genus. Their strong flying form allows them to fly 60 miles per hour using tail winds and at altitudes over 10,000 feet. This makes them unique among bats, as they are the only bat family that withstands the elevation. They are widespread, being found on every continent except Antarctica. They are typically found in caves, abandoned mines, or tunnels.

== Common ancestry ==
The family's scientific name comes from the type genus Molossus, which in turn is from the Molossus breed of dogs.

The family's common name is derived from a length of "free" tail, projecting beyond the end of the uropatagium—the membrane that connects the base of the tail to the hind legs.

Another common name for some members of this group, and indeed a few species from other families, is mastiff bat. The western mastiff bat (Eumops perotis), a large species from the Southwestern United States and Mexico, with wings over 0.5 m (1.6 ft) across, is perhaps one of the best-known with this name. They are widespread, being found on every continent except Antarctica.

== Anatomy ==
The tail is usually best seen when resting. A special ring of cartilage slides up or down the tail vertebrae by muscular action to stretch or retract the tail membrane. This gives many species a degree of fine tuning in their flight maneuvers to rival their day-flying ecological equivalents, such as swifts, swallows, and martins. As a result, these animals include the fastest-flying of all bat species among their number. The dental formula of free-tailed bats varies between species: 1.1.1-2.2-31-3.1.2.3

Free-tailed bats are usually grey, brown, or black in color, with some exceptions. They range from 4 to 12 cm (1.6 to 4.7 in) in length, excluding the tail, and can weigh from 8 to 220 g (0.28 to 7.76 oz), depending on species. They are insectivorous and catch their food on the wing. While some species roost in small groups in hollow trees or rocky crevices, some cave-dwelling species form vast colonies of up to 50 million individuals.

Molecular sequence data support the monophyly of the Molossidae as a whole, but not that of many of its genera, such as Chaerephon, Mops, Mormopterus, and Tadarida. The grouping of Chaerephon minus C. jobimena plus Mops was found to be monophyletic, as was Otomops.

== Systematics ==
- Molossinae
  - Cheiromeles
  - - Mormopterus
    - - Old World species
        - - - - Sauromys
              - Tadarida
            - Tadarida
        - - Myopterus
          - - Chaerephon
            - - Chaerephon
              - Mops
        - Otomops
      - New World species
        - - Nyctinomops
          - - Neoplatymops
            - - Cynomops
              - Molossops
        - - - Promops
            - Molossus
        - Eumops

Internal relationship of Molossinae

A 2012 study attempted to show the relationships of genera within the subfamily Molossinae (the other subfamily of Molossidae, Tomopeatinae, only contains the blunt-eared bat). This study used genetic data to create a phylogeny, which contrasted from previous phylogenies constructed using morphological data. Traits that were previously used to group species, such as having a flat skull, were shown to have no relation to evolutionary relationship, meaning that flat-headedness evolved multiple times within the family. Of the 16 genera of Molossinae, 15 were used to create the phylogeny (left), with researchers unable to include Peters's flat-headed bat, the only member of Platymops.

The results of this study showed that Chaerephon is paraphyletic, forming a clade with Mops. Support for Old World and New World clades was strong. While the genus Tadarida has one New World species, the Mexican free-tailed bat, the genus itself has its origins in the Old World. The most recent common ancestor of Tadarida with New World genera was 29 million years ago. Several tribes have been proposed within the Molossinae. Ammerman et al. proposed Molossini (containing Molossus, Eumops, Molossops, Cynomops, Neoplatymops, Nyctinomops, and Promops); Tadarini (containing Tadarida, Chaerephon, Mops, Platymops, Sauromys, Myopterus, and Otomops); Cheiromelini (containing Cheiromeles); and Mormopterini (containing Mormopterus)

=== Classification ===
The 19 genera contain about 100 species:

Family Mollosidae

- Genus †Cuvierimops
- Genus †Nyctinomus
- Genus †Petramops
- Genus †Potamops
- Genus †Rhizomops
- Genus †Wallia
- Subfamily Molossinae
  - Genus Cabreramops – dog-faced bat
    - Equatorial dog-faced bat, Cabreramops aequatorianus
  - Genus Chaerephon – lesser mastiff bats
    - Duke of Abruzzi's free-tailed bat, Chaerephon aloysiisabaudiae
    - Ansorge's free-tailed bat, Chaerephon ansorgei
    - Gland-tailed free-tailed bat, Chaerephon bemmeleni
    - Spotted free-tailed bat, Chaerephon bivittata
    - Fijian mastiff bat, Chaerephon bregullae
    - Chapin's free-tailed bat, Chaerephon chapini
    - Gallagher's free-tailed bat, Chaerephon gallagheri
    - Northern freetail bat, Chaerephon jobensis
    - Black and red free-tailed bat, Chaerephon jobimena
    - Northern free-tailed bat, Chaerephon johorensis
    - Grandidier's free-tailed bat, Chaerephon leucogaster
    - Lappet-eared free-tailed bat, Chaerephon major
    - Nigerian free-tailed bat, Chaerephon nigeriae
    - Wrinkle-lipped free-tailed bat, Chaerephon plicata
    - Little free-tailed bat, Chaerephon pumilus
    - Russet free-tailed bat, Chaerephon russata
    - Solomons mastiff bat, Chaerephon solomonis
    - São Tomé free-tailed bat, Chaerephon tomensis
  - Genus Cheiromeles – naked bats, or hairless bats
    - Greater naked bat, Cheiromeles torquatus
    - Lesser naked bat, Cheiromeles parvidens
  - Genus Cynomops
    - Cinnamon dog-faced bat, Cynomops abrasus
    - Freeman's dog-faced bat, Cynomops freemani
    - Greenhall's dog-faced bat, Cynomops greenhalli
    - Mexican dog-faced bat, Cynomops mexicanus
    - Para dog-faced bat, Cynomops paranus
    - Southern dog-faced bat, Cynomops planirostris
  - Genus Eumops – mastiff bats, or bonneted bats
    - Black bonneted bat, Eumops auripendulus
    - Dwarf bonneted bat, Eumops bonariensis
    - Big bonneted bat, Eumops dabbenei
    - Fierce bonneted bat, Eumops ferox
    - Florida bonneted bat, Eumops floridanus
    - Wagner's bonneted bat, Eumops glaucinus
    - Sanborn's bonneted bat, Eumops hansae
    - Guianan bonneted bat, Eumops maurus
    - Patagonian bonneted bat, Eumops patagonicus
    - Western mastiff bat, Eumops perotis
    - Colombian bonneted bat, Eumops trumbulli
    - Underwood's bonneted bat, Eumops underwoodi
    - Wilson's bonneted bat, Eumops wilsoni
  - Genus Mormopterus
    - Subgenus Mormopterus
      - Natal free-tailed bat, Mormopterus acetabulosus
      - Moutou's free-tailed bat, Mormopterus francoismoutoui
      - Sumatran mastiff bat, Mormopterus doriae
      - Peters's wrinkle-lipped bat, Mormopterus jugularis
      - Kalinowski's mastiff bat, Mormopterus kalinowskii
      - Little goblin bat, Mormopterus minutus
      - Incan little mastiff bat, Mormopterus phrudus
    - Subgenus Micronomus
      - Beccari's mastiff bat, Mormopterus beccarii
      - Bristle-faced free-tailed bat, Mormopterus eleryi
      - Loria's mastiff bat, Mormopterus loriae
      - East-coast free-tailed bat, Mormopterus norfolkensis
      - Southern free-tailed bat, Mormopterus planiceps
  - Genus Molossops – broad-faced bats
    - Rufous dog-faced bat, Molossops neglectus
    - Dwarf dog-faced bat, Molossops temminckii
  - Genus Molossus – velvety free-tailed bats
    - Alvarez's mastiff bat, Molossus alvarezi
    - Aztec mastiff bat, Molossus aztecus
    - Barnes' mastiff bat, Molossus barnesi
    - Coiban mastiff bat, Molossus coibensis
    - Bonda mastiff bat, Molossus currentium
    - Velvety free-tailed bat, Molossus molossus
    - Miller's mastiff bat, Molossus pretiosus
    - Black mastiff bat, Molossus rufus
    - Sinaloan mastiff bat, Molossus sinaloae
  - Genus Mops – greater mastiff bats
    - Subgenus Xiphonycteris
      - Spurrell's free-tailed bat, Mops spurrelli
      - Dwarf free-tailed bat, Mops nanulus
      - Peterson's free-tailed bat, Mops petersoni
      - Sierra Leone free-tailed bat, Mops brachypterus
      - Bakari's free-tailed bat, Mops bakarii
      - Railer bat, Mops thersites
    - Subgenus Mops
      - Angolan free-tailed bat, Mops condylurus
      - White-bellied free-tailed bat, Mops niveiventer
      - Mongalla free-tailed bat, Mops demonstrator
      - Malayan free-tailed bat, Mops mops
      - Sulawesi free-tailed bat, Mops sarasinorum
      - Trevor's free-tailed bat, Mops trevori
      - Medje free-tailed bat, Mops congicus
      - Midas free-tailed bat, Mops midas
      - Niangara free-tailed bat, Mops niangarae
      - Malagasy white-bellied free-tailed bat, Mops leucostigma
  - Genus Myopterus
    - Daubenton's free-tailed bat, Myopterus daubentonii
    - Bini free-tailed bat, Myopterus whitleyi
  - Genus Nyctinomops – New World free-tailed bats
    - Peale's free-tailed bat, Nyctinomops aurispinosus
    - Pocketed free-tailed bat, Nyctinomops femorosaccus
    - Broad-eared bat, Nyctinomops laticaudatus
    - Big free-tailed bat, Nyctinomops macrotis
  - Genus Neoplatymops
    - Mato Grosso dog-faced bat, Neoplatymops mattogrossensis
  - Genus Otomops – big-eared free-tailed bats
    - Javan mastiff bat, Otomops formosus
    - Johnstone's mastiff bat, Otomops johnstonei
    - Madagascar free-tailed bat, Otomops madagascariensis
    - Large-eared free-tailed bat, Otomops martiensseni
    - Big-eared mastiff bat, Otomops papuensis
    - Mantled mastiff bat, Otomops secundus
    - Wroughton's free-tailed bat, Otomops wroughtoni
  - Genus Platymops
    - Peters's flat-headed bat, Platymops setiger
  - Genus Promops – domed-palate mastiff bats
    - Big crested mastiff bat, Promops centralis
    - Brown mastiff bat, Promops nasutus
  - Genus Sauromys
    - Roberts's flat-headed bat, Sauromys petrophilus
  - Genus Tadarida – free-tailed bats
    - Egyptian free-tailed bat, Tadarida aegyptiaca
    - Mexican free-tailed bat, Tadarida brasiliensis
    - Madagascan large free-tailed bat, Tadarida fulminans
    - East Asian free-tailed bat, Tadarida insignis
    - La Touche's free-tailed bat, Tadarida latouchei
    - Kenyan big-eared free-tailed bat, Tadarida lobata
    - European free-tailed bat, Tadarida teniotis
    - African giant free-tailed bat, Tadarida ventralis
  - Genus Austronomus
    - White-striped free-tailed bat, Austronomus australis
    - New Guinea free-tailed bat, Austronomus kuboriensis
- Subfamily Tomopeatinae
  - Genus Tomopeas
    - Blunt-eared bat, Tomopeas ravus
