= Joel Asaph Allen =

American zoologist and ornithologist

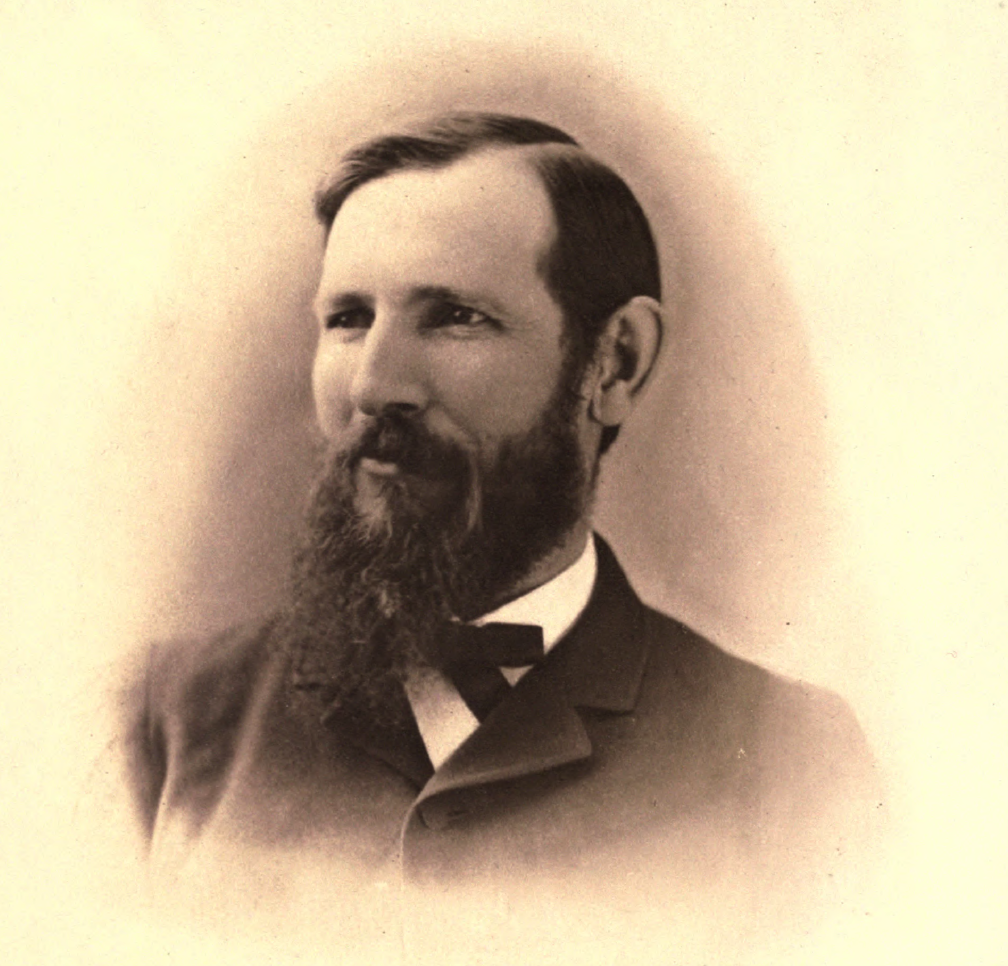
- Born: July 19, 1838; Springfield, Massachusetts
- Died: August 29, 1921 (aged 83)
- Education: Harvard University
- Known for: Allen's rule
- Parents: Joel Allen (father); Harriet Trumbull (mother)
- Scientific career
- Fields: Ornithology; Zoology
- Workplaces: American Academy of Arts and Sciences; Museum of Comparative Zoology; American Association for the Advancement of Science; Audubon Society; American Philosophical Society
- Author abbrev. (zoology): Allen, J.A.Allen

Joel Asaph Allen (July 19, 1838 – August 29, 1921) was an American zoologist, mammalogist, and ornithologist. He became the first president of the American Ornithologists' Union, the first curator of birds and mammals at the American Museum of Natural History, and the first head of that museum's Department of Ornithology. He is remembered for Allen's rule, which states that the bodies of endotherms (warm-blooded animals) vary in shape with climate, having increased surface area in hot climates to lose heat, and minimized surface area in cold climates, to conserve heat.

== Early life ==
Allen was born in Springfield, Massachusetts, the son of Joel Allen and Harriet Trumbull. He studied and collected specimen of natural history early in life, but he was forced to sell his relatively large collection so that he could attend the Wilbraham & Monson Academy in 1861. The following year, he transferred to Harvard University, where he studied under Louis Agassiz.

== Career as a field collector of natural history ==
In 1865, Allen took part in the Thayer Expedition, which Agassiz led to Brazil partly to search for evidence of an ice age there, which he later claimed to have found. Returning home in 1866, Allen returned to his family farm in Springfield due to chronic ill health.

By 1867, Allen's health had improved enough that he went on a flurry of collecting trips, including at Sodus Bay, and in Illinois, Michigan, and Indiana. Upon his return to Massachusetts, he took the position of curator of birds and mammals at Harvard's Museum of Comparative Zoology. In the winter of 1868–1869, he was one of two ornithologists, the other being Charles Johnson Maynard, to explore the relatively unknown state of Florida, which was still very much a wilderness in the late 1860s.

When he returned, he wrote a celebrated analysis of his trip entitled On the Mammals and Winter Birds of Eastern Florida, which was published in 1871. That same year he was elected a Fellow of the American Academy of Arts and Sciences.

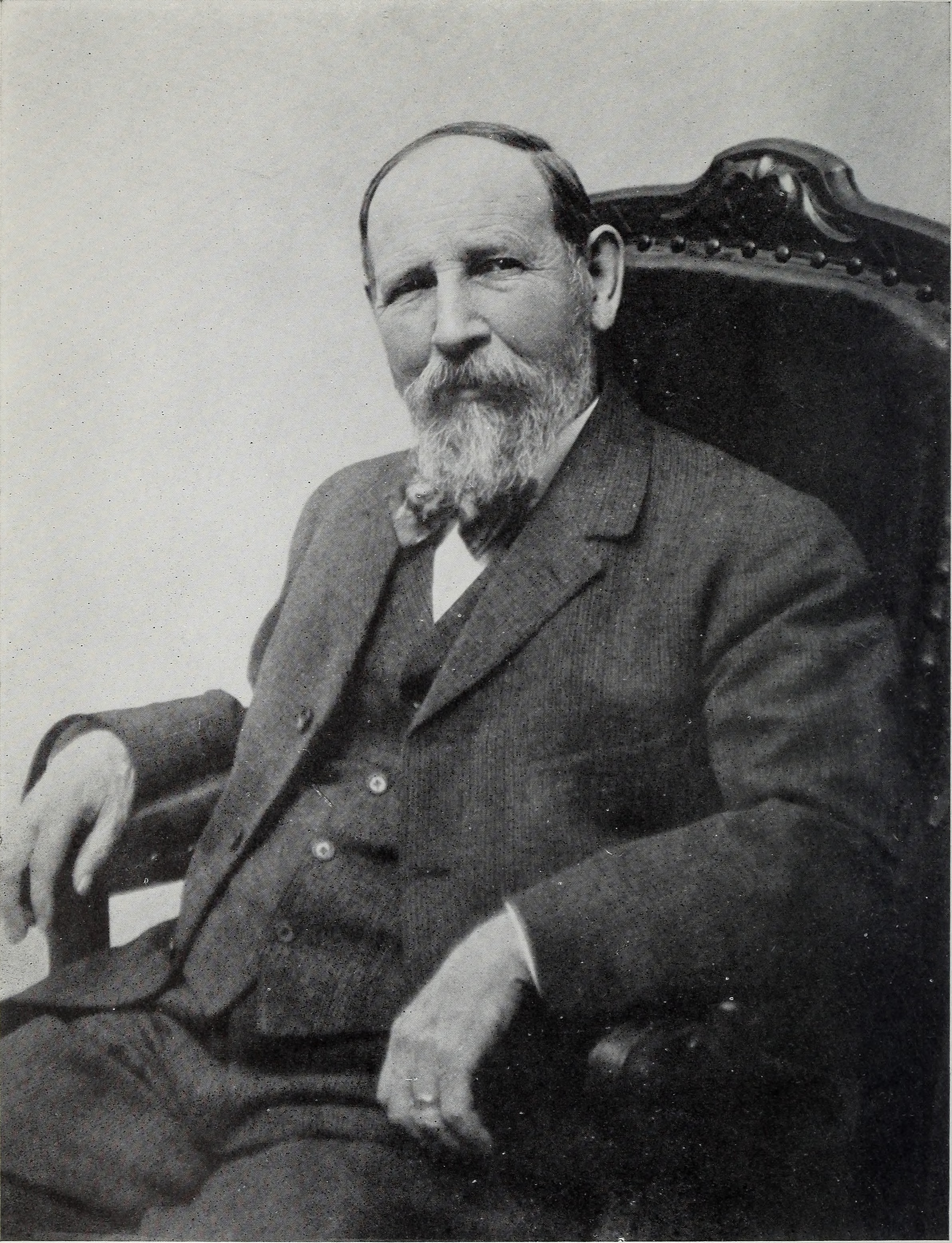
Allen in 1920

For the next few years, Allen ventured to the Great Plains, Rocky Mountains, and Dakota Territory on collecting trips for Harvard's museum. Except for an 1882 collecting trip in Colorado with fellow ornithologist William Brewster, Allen never went field collecting again, primarily because of his fragile health.

== Career as a researcher and natural historian ==
Following the end of his field-collecting days, Allen dedicated his life to research and editorial publication. In the early summer of 1876, Allen was elected by the Nuttall Ornithological Club to replace Charles Johnson Maynard and Henry Augustus Purdie as editor of their Bulletin. In 1883, Allen, along with William Brewster and Elliott Coues, created the American Ornithologists' Union. Allen, who was suffering ill health, was unable to attend their inaugural meeting, but was elected their first president, nonetheless. He also became the chief editor of their journal, The Auk.

In 1885, he was appointed as the first curator of birds and mammals at the American Museum of Natural History in New York, later becoming the first head of the museum's Department of Ornithology. In 1886, he was one of the incorporators of the first Audubon Society, New York City. He was a member of the American Association for the Advancement of Science, and of the American Philosophical Society.

The hundreds of letters which Elliott Coues sent to him over many decades form one of the cornerstones of the history of American ornithology. Allen famously memorialized Coues in the pages of The Auk, the union's journal, after the latter's death in 1899. He formulated what is now known as Allen's rule, stating a correlation between body shape and climate, in 1877.

== Selected works ==
- On the Mammals and Winter Birds of Eastern Florida (1871)
- The American Bisons (1876)
- History of the American Bison, Bison americanus (1877)
- Monographs of North American Rodentia (with Elliott Coues 1877)
- History of North American Pinnipedia (1880)
- The Right Whale of the North Atlantic (1883)
- Mammals of Southern Patagonia (1905)
- The Influence of Physical Conditions in the Genesis of Species (1905)
- Ontogenetic and Other Variations in Musk-Oxen (1913)
