= List of bats by population =

This is a list of bat species by global population. While numbers are estimates, they have been made by the experts in their fields. For more information on how these estimates were ascertained, see Wikipedia's articles on population biology and population ecology.

This list is not comprehensive, as not all bats have had their numbers quantified.

Common name	Binomial name	Population	Status	Trend	Notes	Image
Christmas Island pipistrelle	Pipistrellus murrayi	0	EX	Steady	Believed to be extinct after 2009, when the last call of a bat was recorded.	
Jamaican greater funnel-eared bat	Natalus jamaicensis	50	CR	▼	Only found in the St. Clair Cave in Jamaica. Population estimate was done in 1970.	
Seychelles sheath-tailed bat	Coleura seychellensis	50-100	CR	▼	Maximum estimate for mature individuals.	
Cuban greater funnel-eared bat	Natalus primus	100	VU	▼	Maximum estimate. Only found in a single cave.	
Bulmer's fruit bat	Aproteles bulmerae	137-160	CR	▼	Only one colony is known to exist.	
Flat-headed myotis	Myotis planiceps	240	EN	▼	Maximum estimate for mature individuals.	
Jamaican flower bat	Phyllonycteris aphylla	250	CR	▼	Colonies only at Marta Tick Cave and Stony Hill Cave.	
Bonin flying fox	Pteropus pselaphon	200-250	EN	Steady	Maximum estimate.	
Arnhem leaf-nosed bat	Hipposideros inornatus	300	VU	▼	No robust estimates of population size.	
New Georgian monkey-faced bat	Pteralopex taki	100-3,000 (best estimate: 400)	VU	▼	Estimate is for mature individuals.	
Canary long-eared bat	Plecotus teneriffae	500 – 2,000	CR	▼		
Livingstone's fruit bat	Pteropus livingstonii	1,200-1,500	EN	Steady		
Coastal sheath-tailed bat	Taphozous australis	9,000-10,000	NT	▼		
New Caledonia wattled bat	Chalinolobus neocaledonicus	1,500-2,000	EN	▼	Maximum estimate from known colonies.	
Azores noctule	Nyctalus azoreum	2,000 – 5,000	VU	▼		
Thailand roundleaf bat	Hipposideros halophyllus	2,500 – 10,000	VU	▼		
Rodrigues flying fox	Pteropus rodricensis	20,000	EN	▲		
Kitti's hog-nosed bat	Craseonycteris thonglongyai	6,600	NT	▼	In Thailand, it is found in 44 caves with estimated population size of 6,487 individuals. In Myanmar, it is found in 8 caves with estimated population size of 3,770 individuals.	
Ghost bat	Macroderma gigas	4,000-6,000	VU	▼	Totals differ between authors, with some suggesting somewhere between 4,000 - 6,000, and the previous IUCN Red List account containing an estimate of 7,000-9,000 - but all agree that there are less than 10,000 individuals in existence.	
Comoro rousette	Rousettus obliviosus	10,000-20,000	VU	?		
Giant golden-crowned flying fox	Acerodon jubatus	10,000	EN	▼	Rough estimate; probably no more than 20,000.	
Banana bat	Musonycteris harrisoni	10,000	VU	▼		
Pemba flying fox	Pteropus voeltzkowi	19,000	VU	▲	Increase from a few hundred in the early 1990s.	
Mauritian flying fox	Pteropus niger	37,700	EN	▼	Minimum estimate.	
New Zealand lesser short-tailed bat	Mystacina tuberculata	30,000	VU	▼	Minimum estimate.	
Madagascan flying fox	Pteropus rufus	300,000	VU	▼		
Grey-headed flying fox	Pteropus poliocephalus	320,000 - 674,000 or 467,000	VU	▼	Estimates are based on incomplete knowledge of camp location and use.	
Indiana bat	Myotis sodalis	387,300	NT	Steady	Though numbers are large compared to other bats classified as endangered, this species is listed as such due to a >50% decline over the past decade.	
Straw-coloured fruit bat	Eidolon helvum	1,100,000,000	NT	▼	The most heavily harvested bat for bushmeat in West and Central Africa.	
Pallas's long-tongued bat	Glossophaga soricina	1,030,000,000	LC	Steady		
Angolan rousette	Myonycteris angolensis	823,000,000	LC	▼		
Heller's broad-nosed bat	Platyrrhinus helleri	733,000,000	LC	Steady		
Trident bat	Asellia tridens	740,000,000	LC	Steady		
Great stripe-faced bat	Vampyrodes caraccioli	664,000,000	LC	?		
Franquet's epauletted fruit bat	Epomops franqueti	609,000,000	LC	Steady		
Wahlberg's epauletted fruit bat	Epomophorus wahlbergi'	597,000,000	LC	Steady		
Lesser mouse-tailed bat	Rhinopoma hardwickii	600,000,000	LC	Steady		
Hairy big-eyed bat	Chiroderma villosum	536,000,000	LC	Steady		
Tilda's yellow-shouldered bat	Sturnira tildae	51,000,000	LC	Steady		
Southern red bat	Lasiurus blossevillii	526,000,000	LC	?		
Brown fruit-eating bat	Artibeus concolor	488,000,000	LC	Steady		
Greater bulldog bat	Noctilio leporinus	511,000,000	LC			
Egyptian slit-faced bat	Nycteris thebaica	503,000,000	LC			
MacConnell's bat	Mesophylla macconnelli	473,000,000	LC			
Egyptian fruit bat	Rousettus aegyptiacus	489,000,000	LC			
Little big-eyed bat	Chiroderma trinitatum	459,000,000	LC			
Gambian epauletted fruit bat	Epomophorus gambianus	466,000,000	LC			
Leschenault's rousette	Rousettus leschenaultii	446,000,000	NT	▼	Data from across the species range suggests an overall decline of ca 25% over the last 15 years.	
Serotine	Eptesicus serotinus	438,000,000	LC			
Geoffroy's rousette	Rousettus amplexicaudatus	431,000,000	LC			
Short-headed broad-nosed bat	Platyrrhinus brachycephalus	406,000,000	LC			
Large-eared slit-faced bat	Nycteris macrotis	421,000,000	LC			
Hairy slit-faced bat	Nycteris hispida	401,000,000	LC	Steady		
Greater spear-nosed bat	Phyllostomus hastatus	402,000,000	LC			
Black myotis	Myotis nigricans	376,000,000	LC			
Dawn bat	Eonycteris spelaea	357,000,000	LC	▼		
Black bonneted bat	Eumops auripendulus	351,000,000	LC			
Lander's horseshoe bat	Rhinolophus landeri	346,000,000	LC			
Greater short-nosed fruit bat	Cynopterus sphinx	341,000,000	LC			
Black mastiff bat	Molossus rufus	345,000,000	LC			
Lesser long-eared bat	Nyctophilus geoffroyi	336,000,000	LC	Steady		
Long-tongued nectar bat	Macroglossus minimus	318,000,000	LC	Steady		
Fischer's little fruit bat	Rhinophylla fischerae	310,000,000	LC	Steady		
Pale spear-nosed bat	Phyllostomus discolor	315,000,000	LC	Steady		
White-winged vampire bat	Diaemus youngi	304,000,000	LC	?		
Tomes's sword-nosed bat	Lonchorhina aurita	299,000,000	LC	Steady		
Fringe-lipped bat	Trachops cirrhosus	293,000,000	LC	Steady		
Broad-eared bat	Nyctinomops laticaudatus	289,000,000	LC			
Little white-shouldered bat	Ametrida centurio	273,000,000	LC			
Visored bat	Sphaeronycteris toxophyllum	265,000,000	LC			
Riparian myotis	Myotis riparius	276,000,000	LC	Steady		
Lesser dog-like bat	Peropteryx macrotis	274,000,000	LC			
Southern dog-faced bat	Cynomops planirostris	272,000,000	LC			
Southern yellow bat	Lasiurus ega	276,000,000	LC			
African yellow bat	Scotophilus dinganii	276,000,000	LC	?		
Rüppell's horseshoe bat	Rhinolophus fumigatus	255,000,000	LC	?		
Silver-tipped myotis	Myotis albescens	246,000,000	LC	Steady		
Brazilian brown bat	Eptesicus brasiliensiss	249,000,000	LC			
Hammer-headed bat	Hypsignathus monstrosus	247,000,000	LC			
Greater Asiatic yellow bat	Scotophilus heathii	246,000,000	LC			
Western mastiff bat	Eumops perotis	229,000,000	LC			
Lesser Asiatic yellow bat	Scotophilus kuhlii	229,000,000	LC			
Lesser dog-faced fruit bat	Cynopterus brachyotis	228,000,000	LC			
Lesser woolly bat	Kerivoula lanosa	230,000,000	LC			
Wagner's bonneted bat	Eumops glaucinus	229,000,000	LC			
Variegated butterfly bat	Glauconycteris variegata	229,000,000	LC			
Noack's roundleaf bat	Hipposideros ruber	227,000,000	LC			
Velvety free-tailed bat	Molossus molossus	226,000,000	LC			
Sanborn's bonneted bat	Eumops hansae	219,000,000	LC			
Kuhl's pipistrelle	Pipistrellus kuhlii	215,000,000	LC			
Argentine brown bat	Eptesicus furinalis	213,000,000	LC			
Lesser bulldog bat	Noctilio albiventris	215,000,000	LC			
Great fruit-eating bat	Artibeus lituratus	222,000,000	LC			
Yellow-winged bat	Lavia frons	213,000,000	LC	Steady		
Lesser sac-winged bat	Saccopteryx leptura	208,000,000	LC			
Seba's short-tailed bat	Carollia perspicillata	219,000,000	LC			
Northern little yellow-eared bat	Vampyressa thyone	199,000,000	LC			
Proboscis bat	Rhynchonycteris naso	208,000,000	LC			
Pale-faced bat	Phylloderma stenops	219,000,000	LC			
Dark fruit-eating bat	Artibeus obscurus	217,000,000	LC			
Spix's disk-winged bat	Thyroptera tricolor	201,000,000	LC			
Coiban mastiff bat	Molossus coibensis	205,000,000	LC			
Long-legged bat	Macrophyllum macrophyllum	199,000,000	LC			
Para dog-faced bat	Cynomops paranus	202,000,000	DD			
Cinnamon dog-faced bat	Cynomops abrasus	201,000,000	DD			
Northern ghost bat	Diclidurus albus	195,000,000	LC			
Gould's wattled bat	Chalinolobus gouldii	193,000,000	LC	Steady		
Lesser mouse-eared bat	Myotis blythii	191,000,000	LC	▼		
Common pipistrelle	Pipistrellus pipistrellus	188,000,000	LC	Steady		
Golden bat	Mimon bennettii	187,000,000	LC			
Big brown bat	Eptesicus fuscus	186,000,000	LC	▲		
Large-eared free-tailed bat	Otomops martiensseni	186,000,000	NT	▼		
Thumbless bat	Furipterus horrens	185,000,000	LC			
Chestnut sac-winged bat	Cormura brevirostris	182,000,000	LC			
Greater dog-like bat	Peropteryx kappleri	182,000,000	LC			
Horsfield's fruit bat	Cynopterus horsfieldii	180,000,000	LC			
Rufous dog-faced bat	Molossops neglectus	179,000,000	DD			
Little broad-nosed bat	Scotorepens greyii	177,000,000	LC			
Lesser spear-nosed bat	Phyllostomus elongatus	176,000,000	LC			
Ethiopian epauletted fruit bat	Epomophorus labiatus	173,000,000	LC			
Natterer's bat	Myotis nattereri	172,000,000	LC	Steady		
Geoffroy's tailless bat	Anoura geoffroyi	171,000,000	LC			
Tricolored big-eared bat	Glyphonycteris sylvestris	171,000,000	LC			
Mexican free-tailed bat	Tadarida brasiliensis	168,000,000	LC			
Frosted sac-winged bat	Saccopteryx canescens	167,000,000	LC			
Silver-haired bat	Lasionycteris noctivagans	165,000,000	LC			
Greater mouse-tailed bat	Rhinopoma microphyllum	164,000,000	LC	Steady		
Brown tent-making bat	Uroderma magnirostrum	164,000,000	LC			
White-bellied big-eared bat	Micronycteris minuta	162,000,000	LC			
Hoary bat	Lasiurus cinereus	161,000,000	LC			
Tent-making bat	Uroderma bilobatum	160,000,000	LC			
Long-tongued fruit bat	Macroglossus sobrinus	159,000,000	LC			
Nepal myotis	Myotis nipalensis	159,000,000	LC			
Schmidts's big-eared bat	Micronycteris schmidtorum	158,000,000	LC	Steady		
Colombian bonneted bat	Eumops trumbulli	157,000,000	LC			
Mato Grosso dog-faced bat	Neoplatymops mattogrossensis	157,000,000	LC			
Dwarf dog-faced bat	Molossops temminckii	157,000,000	LC			
Velvety fruit-eating bat	Enchisthenes hartii	155,000,000	LC			
White-winged dog-like bat	Peropteryx leucoptera	154,000,000	LC			
Yellow-bellied sheath-tailed bat	Saccolaimus flaviventris	154,000,000	LC	▼		
Little brown bat	Myotis lucifugus	151,000,000	EN	▼	The best available evidence as of 2021 conservatively predicts a 99% chance of Little Brown Bat extinction in the northeastern U.S. by at least 2026 due to white-nose syndrome.	
Finlayson's cave bat	Vespadelus finlaysoni	151,000,000	LC			
Pygmy round-eared bat	Lophostoma brasiliense	149,000,000	LC	Steady		
Pygmy round-eared bat	Scotoecus hirundo	149,000,000	LC			
Big-eared woolly bat	Chrotopterus auritus	148,000,000	LC	Steady		
Schlieffen's bat	Nycticeinops schlieffeni	148,000,000	LC			
Salvin's big-eyed bat	Chiroderma salvini	145,000,000	LC			
Little collared fruit bat	Myonycteris torquata	147,000,000	LC			
Little big-eared bat	Micronycteris megalotis	144,000,000	LC			
Welwitsch's bat	Myotis welwitschii	144,000,000	LC			
Wagner's mustached bat	Pteronotus personatus	144,000,000	LC	Steady		
Shaggy bat	Centronycteris maximiliani	144,000,000	LC			
Short-palated fruit bat	Casinycteris argynnis	142,000,000	LC			
White-throated round-eared bat	Lophostoma silvicolum	142,000,000	LC			
Little red flying fox	Pteropus scapulatus	142,000,000	LC			
Hairy-legged vampire bat	Diphylla ecaudata	140,000,000	LC			
White-bellied yellow bat	Scotophilus leucogaster	141,000,000	LC			
Eastern greenish yellow bat	Scotophilus viridis	139,000,000	LC			
Greater yellow-shouldered bat	Sturnira magna	139,000,000	LC			
Flat-faced fruit-eating bat	Artibeus planirostris	138,000,000	LC			
Peters's Epauletted Fruit Bat	Epomophorus crypturus	138,000,000	LC			
Peters's disk-winged bat	Thyroptera discifera	135,000,000	LC			
Great woolly horseshoe bat	Rhinolophus luctus	134,000,000	LC			
Thomas's nectar bat	Lonchophylla thomasi	131,000,000	LC			
Moloney's mimic bat	Mimetillus moloneyi	131,000,000	LC			
Large slit-faced bat	Nycteris grandis	131,000,000	LC	▼		
Greater horseshoe bat	Rhinolophus ferrumequinum	130,000,000	LC			
Intermediate roundleaf bat	Hipposideros larvatus	128,000,000	LC			
Inland broad-nosed bat	Scotorepens balstoni	128,000,000	LC	▼		
Dwarf little fruit bat	Rhinophylla pumilio	125,000,000	LC			
Stripe-headed round-eared bat	Tonatia saurophila	125,000,000	LC			
Ognev's long-eared bat	Plecotus ognevi	124,000,000	LC			
Northern bat	Eptesicus nilssonii	121,000,000	LC	Steady		
Chestnut long-tongued bat	Lionycteris spurrelli	121,000,000	LC			
Greater dawn bat	Eonycteris major	119,000,000	NT			
Chestnut short-tailed bat	Carollia castanea	117,000,000	LC			
Veldkamp's dwarf epauletted fruit bat	Nanonycteris veldkampii	117,000,000	LC			
Bates's slit-faced bat	Nycteris arge	115,000,000	LC	Steady		
Brown long-eared bat	Plecotus auritus	114,000,000	LC	Steady		
Pratt's roundleaf bat	Hipposideros pratti	113,000,000	LC			
Common blossom bat	Syconycteris australis	113,000,000	LC	Steady		
Diadem leaf-nosed bat	Hipposideros diadema	111,000,000	LC			
Ikonnikov's bat	Myotis ikonnikovi	110,000,000	LC	▼		
Intermediate horseshoe bat	Rhinolophus affinis	110,000,000	LC	Steady		
Dusky leaf-nosed bat	Hipposideros ater	108,000,000	LC			
Rusty pipistrelle	Pipistrellus rusticus	108,000,000	LC	?		
Woermann's bat	Megaloglossus woermanni	106,000,000	LC			
Buettikofer's epauletted fruit bat	Epomops Butikofer	105,000,000	LC			
Greenhall's dog-faced bat	Cynomops greenhalli	103,000,000	LC			
Davies's big-eared bat	Glyphonycteris daviesi	103,000,000	LC			
Wall-roosting mouse-eared bat	Myotis muricola	102,000,000	LC			
Grey long-eared bat	Plecotus austriacus	102,000,000	NT	▼		
Hairy big-eared bat	Micronycteris hirsuta	100,000,000	LC			

- Lists of mammals by population
- Lists of organisms by population
- List of bats
