= Patagonian bonneted bat =

Conservation status
- Least Concern (IUCN 3.1)

Scientific classification
- Kingdom: Animalia
- Phylum: Chordata
- Class: Mammalia
- Order: Chiroptera
- Family: Molossidae
- Genus: Eumops
- Species: E. patagonicus

Binomial name
- Eumops patagonicus Thomas, 1924
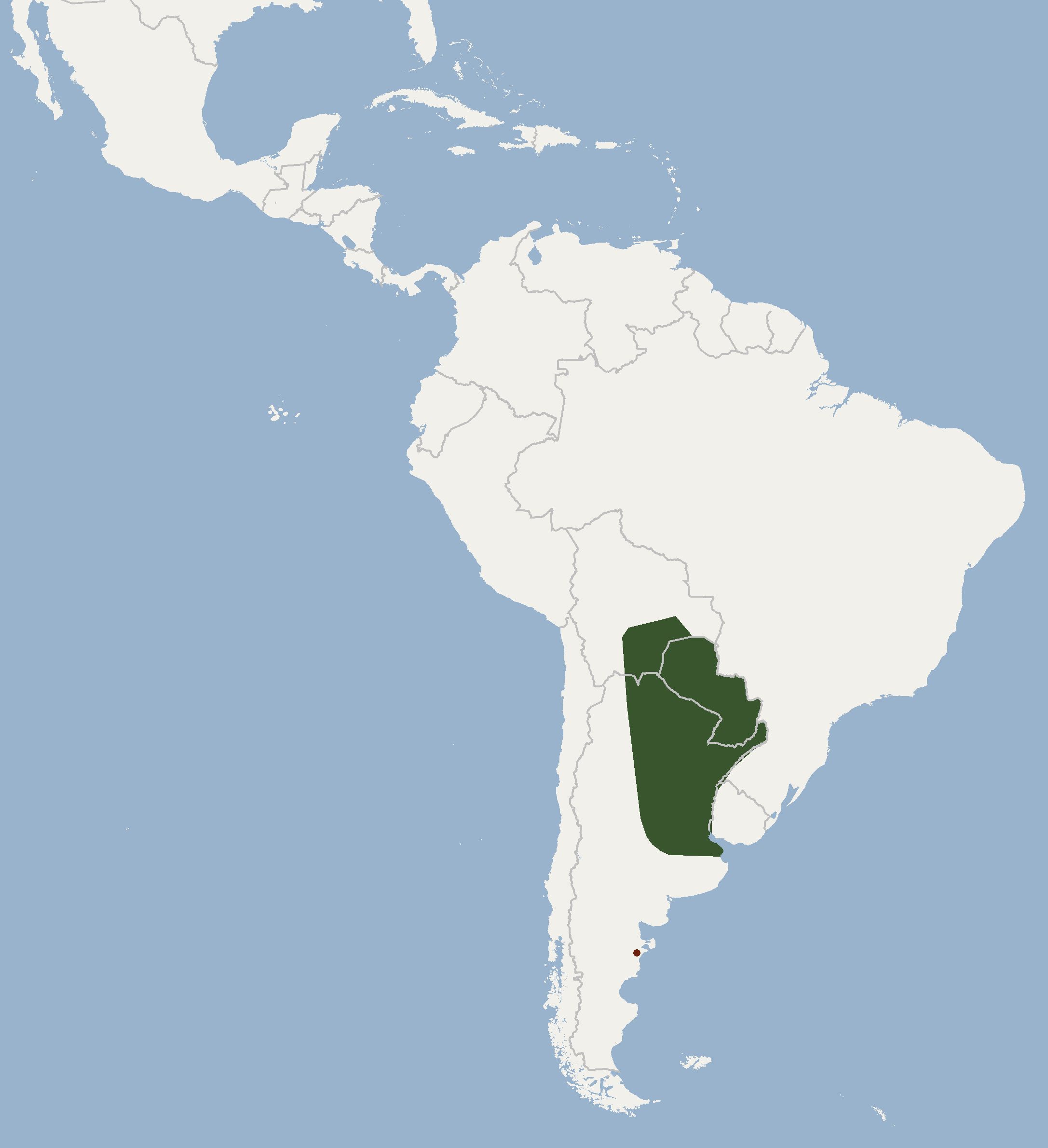

Synonyms
- Eumops bonariensis patagonicus Thomas, 1924; Eumops bonariensis beckeri Sanborn, 1932

Species of bat

The Patagonian bonneted bat (Eumops patagonicus), also called the Patagonian dwarf bonneted bat, is a species of free-tailed bat found in Argentina, Bolivia and Paraguay.

== Taxonomy and etymology ==
It was described as a new species in 1924 by British zoologist Oldfield Thomas. Thomas had obtained the holotype from Argentinean-Italian scientist Roberto Dabbene, who worked in Buenos Aires at the time. Its species name "patagonicus" means "belonging to Patagonia." The Patagonian bonneted bat was widely considered a subspecies of the dwarf bonneted bat (Eumops bonariensis) from approximately 1932 until the 1990s. Based on Gregorin et al.'s 2016 classification, the Patagonian bonneted bat is a member of the bonariensis species group of the genus Eumops. Other members include the dwarf bonneted bat, E. delticus, and E. nanus.

== Description ==
It is a small member of its genus, with a forearm length of 44 mm (1.7 in). Its head and body is 54 mm (2.1 in); its tail is 31 mm (1.2 in) long; its ears are 14.5 mm (0.57 in) long.

== Range and habitat ==
Its range includes several countries in southern South America, including Argentina, Bolivia, and Paraguay.

== Conservation ==
It is currently evaluated as least concern by the IUCN—its lowest conservation priority. It meets the criteria for this assessment because it has a large range, its population size is likely large, and it is not thought to be in rapid population decline.
