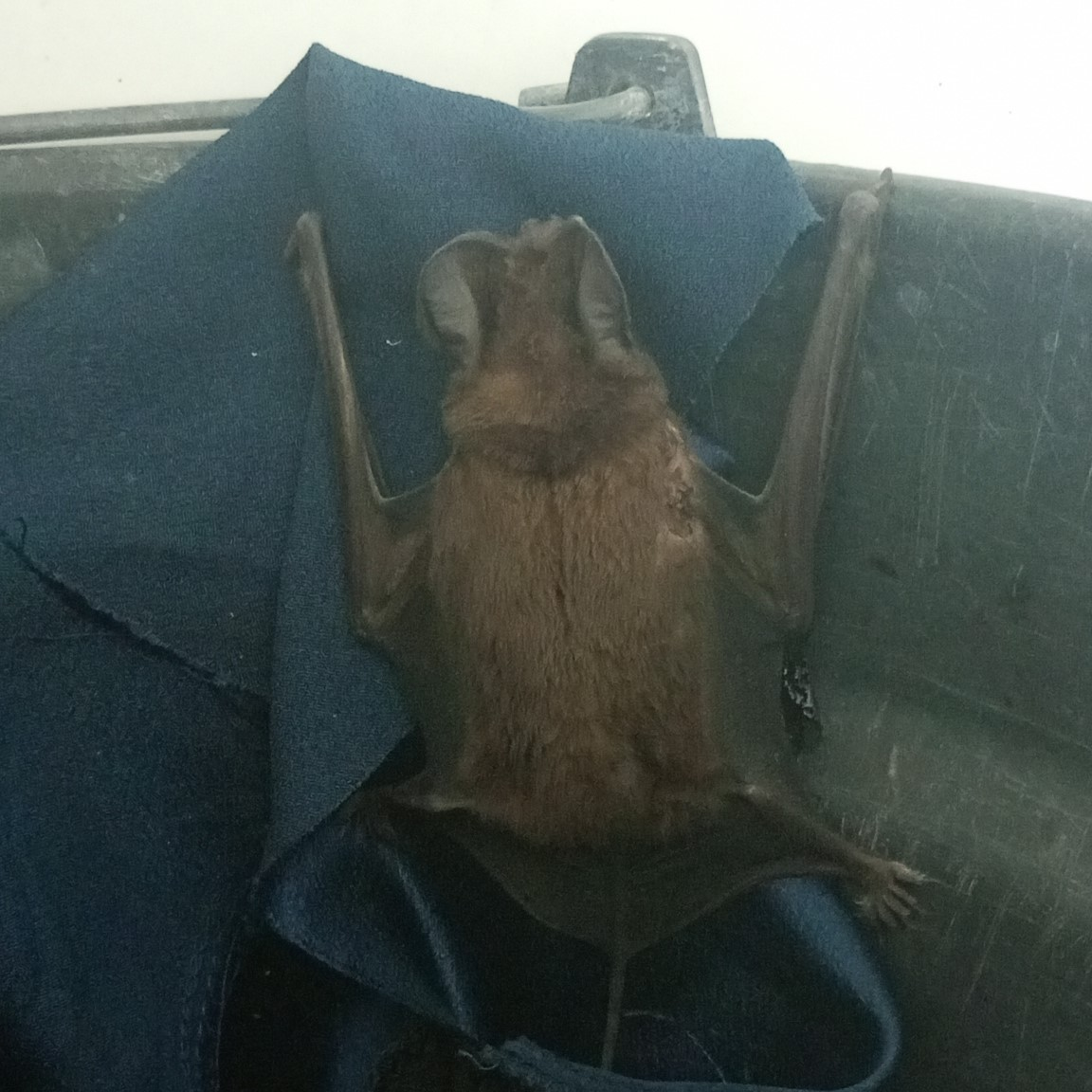

Conservation status
- Data Deficient (IUCN 3.1)

Scientific classification
- Kingdom: Animalia
- Phylum: Chordata
- Class: Mammalia
- Order: Chiroptera
- Family: Molossidae
- Genus: Eumops
- Species: E. wilsoni

Binomial name
- Eumops wilsoni Baker, McDonough, Swier, Larsen, Carrera & Ammerman, 2009
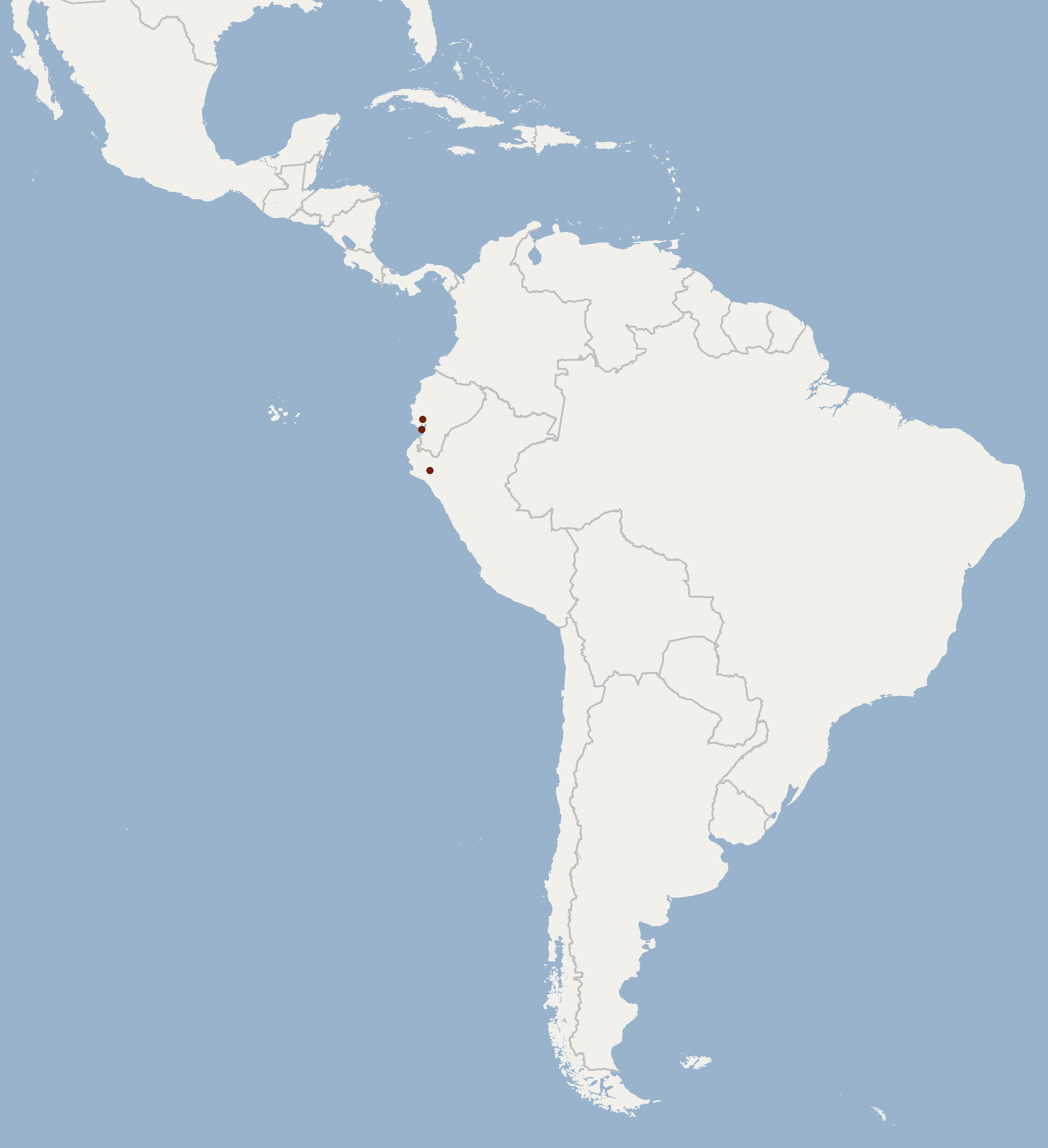

= Eumops wilsoni =

Species of bat

Eumops wilsoni is a species of bat native to Ecuador and Peru. The bat has a distinct karyotype, sequence of the mitochondrial cytochrome-b gene, and other distinct genetic markers that distinguish it from closely related bats such as Eumops glaucinus and Eumops ferox. However, there are no morphological distinctions from those related species and thus there is uncertainty about its geographic distribution and population status, leading to its classification as "data deficient". Local threats to the bat's dry forest habitat further impede efforts to study the bats. Transition to farmland and urbanization threatens the dry forest habitat of the bat in the Andes. As an endemic species, the bat may be threatened by this habitat loss.

== Taxonomy and etymology ==
It was described as a new species in 2009 as the result of a taxonomic split in Wagner's bonneted bat. The holotype was collected in Guayas Province, Ecuador, in 2004. It is one of four members of the Wagner's bonneted bat species complex, which also includes the Florida bonneted bat and Eumops ferox—all three of these taxa were formerly included in Wagner's bonneted bat. The eponym for the species name "wilsoni" is mammalogist Don E. Wilson. Of Wilson, the Baker et al. wrote, "It is our pleasure to name this species for him in recognition of his significance to mammalogy."

== Description ==
Its total length is approximately 117.3 mm (4.62 in); the tail makes up 45.3 mm (1.78 in) of its length. Individuals weigh approximately 29.5 g (1.04 oz).

== Biology ==
It has a diploid number of 38 chromosomes and a fundamental number of 54 chromosomes. It has the fewest chromosomes of any member of Eumops (E. ferox also has 38). Additionally, it is the only described free-tailed bat with this karyotype.

== Range and habitat ==
It is known from two countries in South America: Peru and Ecuador. It has been documented in lowland areas from 10–100 m (33–328 ft) above sea level.
