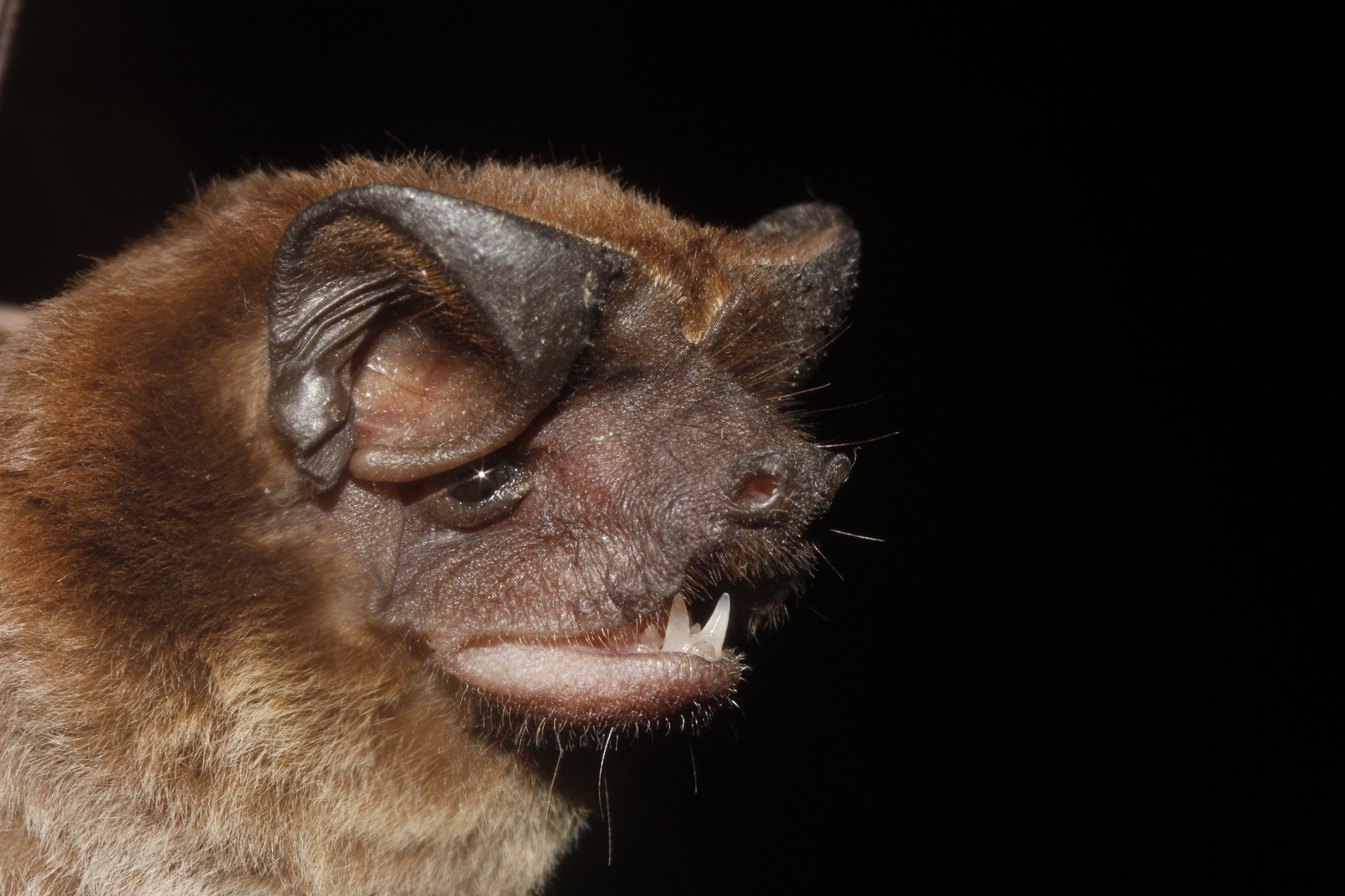

Conservation status
- Least Concern (IUCN 3.1)

Scientific classification
- Kingdom: Animalia
- Phylum: Chordata
- Class: Mammalia
- Order: Chiroptera
- Family: Molossidae
- Genus: Eumops
- Species: E. nanus

Binomial name
- Eumops nanus Miller, 1900

Synonyms
- Promops nanus Miller, 1900; Eumops bonariensis nanus Sanborn, 1932

= Eumops nanus =

Dwarf bonneted bat

Species of bat

Eumops nanus is a species of bat found in Central and South America.

== Taxonomy and etymology ==
It was first described by American zoologist Gerrit Smith Miller Jr. in 1900. Miller initially placed it into the genus Promops. The holotype for the species was collected in Chiriquí Province in Panama; it was sent to Miller by British zoologist Oldfield Thomas. Thomas had received the specimen from HJ Watson, who was the owner of extensive plantations in Panama. When Miller described a new genus of bat in 1906, Eumops, he placed Promops nanus in the new genus, renaming it Eumops nanus. Its taxonomy has been revised several times, however, with some authors considering it a subspecies of the dwarf bonneted bat. E. nanus was consistently maintained as a subspecies of the dwarf bonneted bat from 1932 until 2007, when Eger et al. recommended that it should be elevated to a species once more.

Its species name nanus is from Latin meaning "dwarf." Miller stated that the species reminded him of a miniature Wagner's bonneted bat.

== Description ==
It is the smallest member of its genus, weighing 6–14 g (0.21–0.49 oz). Miller characterized it as "essentially a miniature of Promops glaucinus." Its forearm is approximately 37–49 mm (1.5–1.9 in) long. Its fur is reddish-brown or dark brown. Its lips are wrinkled. The ears are large and rounded, extending slightly over the forehead with their inner edges touching each other. Its tragus is large and rounded. Its calcar has a pronounced keel. Its tail extends beyond the edge of the uropatagium. Its dental formula is 1.1.2.32.1.2.3 for a total of 30 teeth.

== Biology ==
It is nocturnal, roosting in sheltered places during the day. The holotype was collected under the roof of a house where it was roosting. It is also known to roost in tree cavities. It is insectivorous, consuming moths, beetles, true bugs, and other insects. It will forage for prey over bodies of water. In one population in Mexico, late June is the most popular time for parturition. The female nurses the young, called a pup, for 6–8 weeks.

== Range and habitat ==
Its range extends from southern Mexico to northern Colombia and Venezuela, with documented occurrence in Belize, Colombia, Guyana, Honduras, Mexico, Nicaragua, Panama, Peru, and Venezuela. Its occurs in areas of tropical thorn forests, tropical humid forests, and forest edge habitat.

== Conservation ==
It is currently evaluated as least concern by the IUCN—its lowest conservation priority. It meets the criteria for this designation because it has a large range, it occurs in several protected areas, and its population is unlikely to be declining at a rapid rate. Nonetheless, it is a rarely-encountered species.
