= Underwood's bonneted bat =

Conservation status
- Least Concern (IUCN 3.1)

Scientific classification
- Kingdom: Animalia
- Phylum: Chordata
- Class: Mammalia
- Order: Chiroptera
- Family: Molossidae
- Genus: Eumops
- Species: E. underwoodi

Binomial name
- Eumops underwoodi Goodwin, 1940
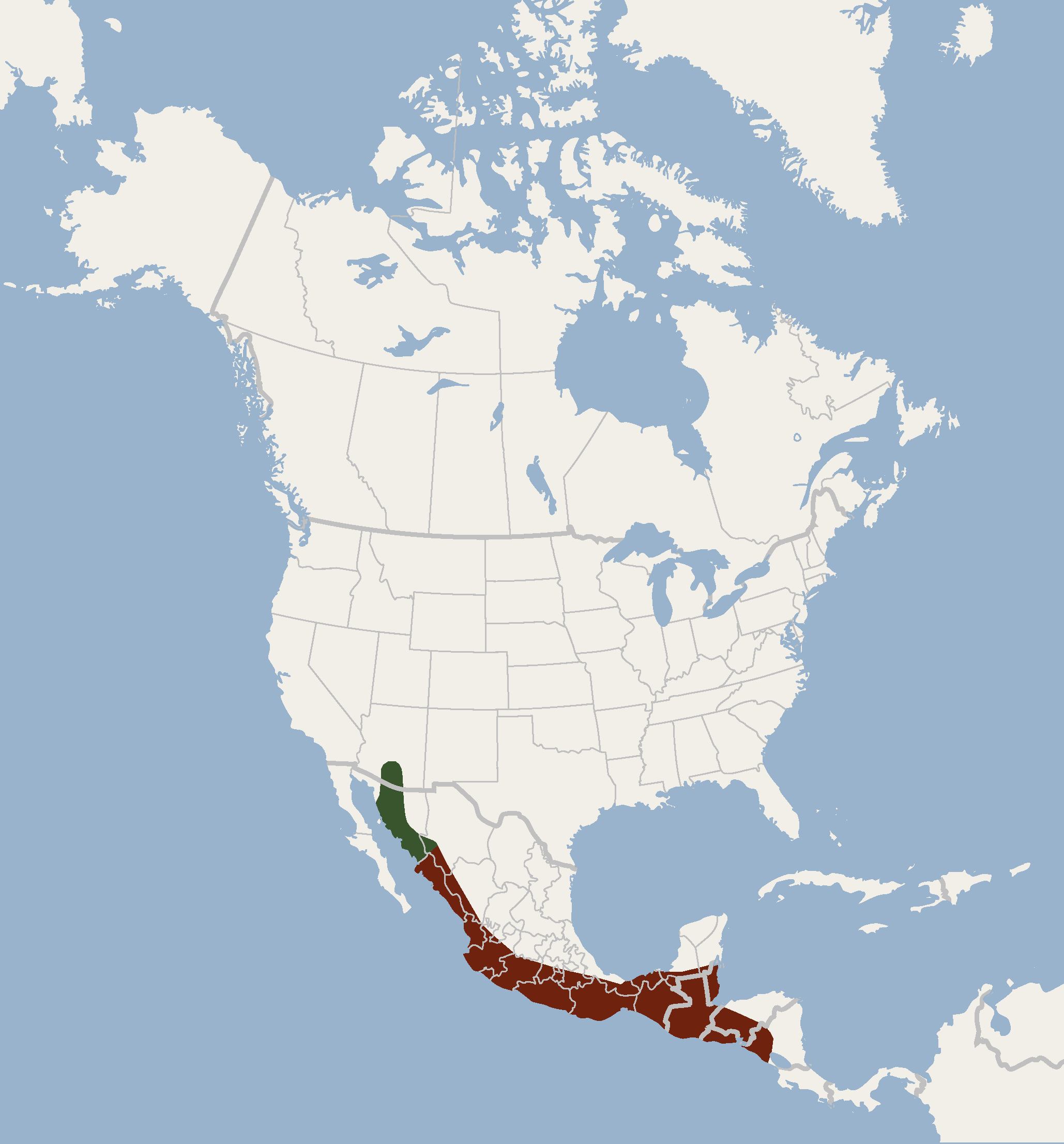

Species of bat

Underwood's bonneted bat (Eumops underwoodi) is a species of bat in the family Molossidae.

== Description ==
Underwood's bonneted bat is sandy brown in color. It is a large bat with a wingspan of 20-22 inches, making it the second-largest bat found within the US, after the greater mastiff bat. Its long, narrow wings and the bones and muscles in its shoulder suggest this bat can fly very swiftly, and E. underwoodi possibly flies all through the night. Like many other species in the genus Eumops, it has a free-hanging tail that sticks far out of its tail membrane.

== Biology and behavior ==
E. underwoodi is known to eat grasshoppers, leafhoppers, moths and beetles. It prefers to roost in tree hollows and under palm fronds, far off the ground. It favors dry roosting sites.

The bat's winter habits are poorly known. In northern parts of its range, it may migrate south for winter. One pup is born in June or July.

== Range ==
It is found in Belize, Costa Rica, El Salvador, Guatemala, Honduras, Mexico, Nicaragua and the southwestern United States.
