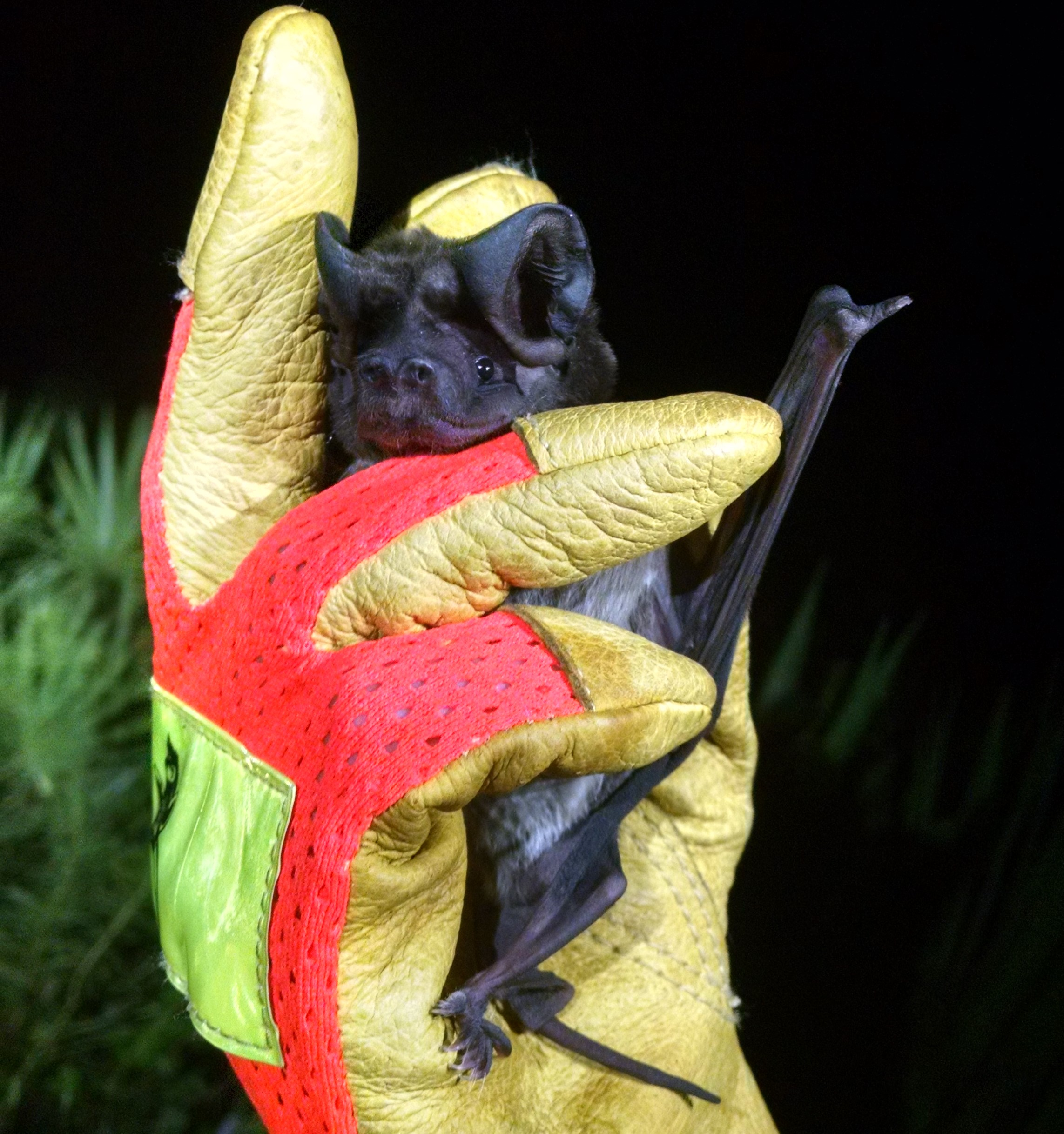
- Florida bonneted bat (Eumops floridanus)

Scientific classification
- Kingdom: Animalia
- Phylum: Chordata
- Class: Mammalia
- Order: Chiroptera
- Family: Molossidae
- Subfamily: Molossinae
- Genus: Eumops; Miller, 1906

Type species
- Molossus californicus Merriam, 1890

Species
- 17, see below.

= Eumops =

Genus of bats

Eumops (mastiff bats or bonneted bats) is a genus of bats in the family Molossidae. A total of 17 species of this genus have been described. The name "Eumops" comes from the Greek prefix Eu-, meaning "good" or "true", and the Malayan word mops, which means bat.

== Systematics ==
- Eumops
  - E. hansae
  - - bonariensis group
      - E. delticus
      - E. patagonicus
      - - E. bonariensis
        - E. nanus
    - - - - - - glaucinus group
                - - - E. dabbenei
                    - E. underwoodi
                  - - E. glaucinus
                    - - E. ferox*
                      - - E. ferox*
                        - E. floridanus
                - E. wilsoni
            - perotis group
              - E. chimaera
              - - E. perotis
                - E. trumbulli
      - auripendulus group
        - E. chiribaya
        - - E. maurus
          - E. auripendulus

Internal relationship of Eumops based on 2016 study(*E. ferox recovered as paraphyletic, possibly because of incomplete lineage sorting)

== Species ==
The following are the seventeen species of Eumops. Eumops chimaera is the most recently described species of this genus, having been first described in 2016. E. wilsoni was described first in 2009 by Baker and colleagues.

- E. auripendulus (Shaw, 1800) — black bonneted bat (Shaw's mastiff bat)
- E. bonariensis (Peters, 1874) — dwarf bonneted bat (Peters' mastiff bat)
- Eumops chimaera (Gregorin, Moras, Acosta, Vasconcellos, Poma, Rodrigues dos Santos & Paca, 2016)
- E. chiribaya (Medina, Gregorin, Zeballos, Zamora, and Moras, 2014) — Chiribaya's bonneted bat
- E. dabbenei (Thomas, 1914) — big bonneted bat (Dabbene's mastiff bat)
- E. delticus (Thomas, 1923)
- E. ferox (Gundlach, 1861)
- E. floridanus (Allen, 1932) — Florida bonneted bat
- E. glaucinus (Wagner, 1843) — Wagner's bonneted bat
- E. hansae (Sanborn, 1932) — Sanborn's bonneted bat (Hansa bonneted bat)
- E. maurus (Thomas, 1901) — Guianan bonneted bat (Thomas's bonneted bat)
- E. nanus (Miller, 1900)
- E. patagonicus (Thomas, 1924) — Patagonian bonneted bat
- E. perotis (Schinz, 1820) — western mastiff bat
- E. trumbulli (Thomas, 1901) — Colombian bonneted bat
- E. underwoodi (Goodwin, 1974) — Underwood's bonneted bat
- E. wilsoni (Baker, McDonough, Swier, Larsen, Carrera, and Ammerman, 2009) — Wilson's bonneted bat
