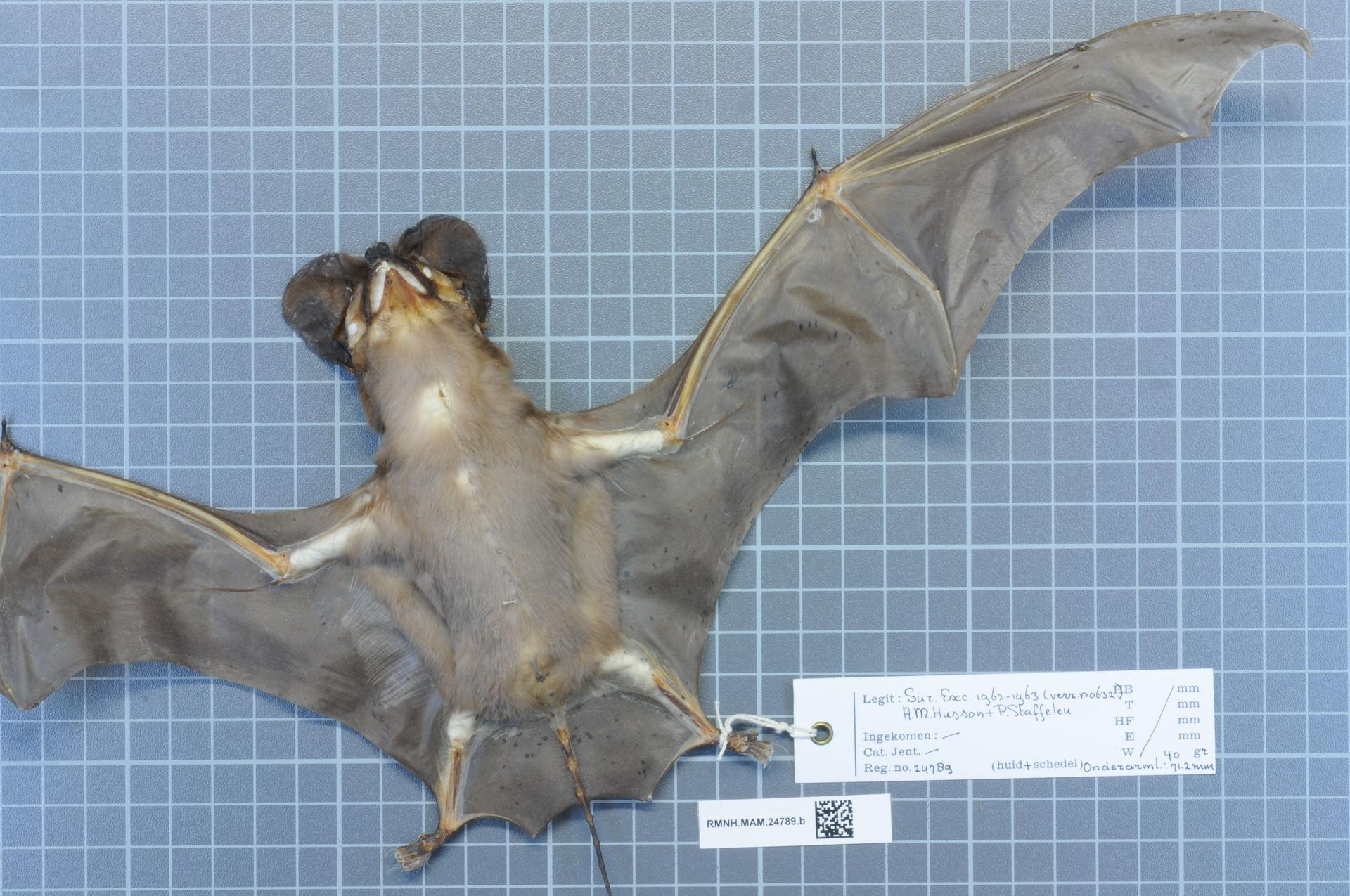

Conservation status
- Least Concern (IUCN 3.1)

Scientific classification
- Kingdom: Animalia
- Phylum: Chordata
- Class: Mammalia
- Order: Chiroptera
- Family: Molossidae
- Genus: Eumops
- Species: E. trumbulli

Binomial name
- Eumops trumbulli (Thomas, 1901)
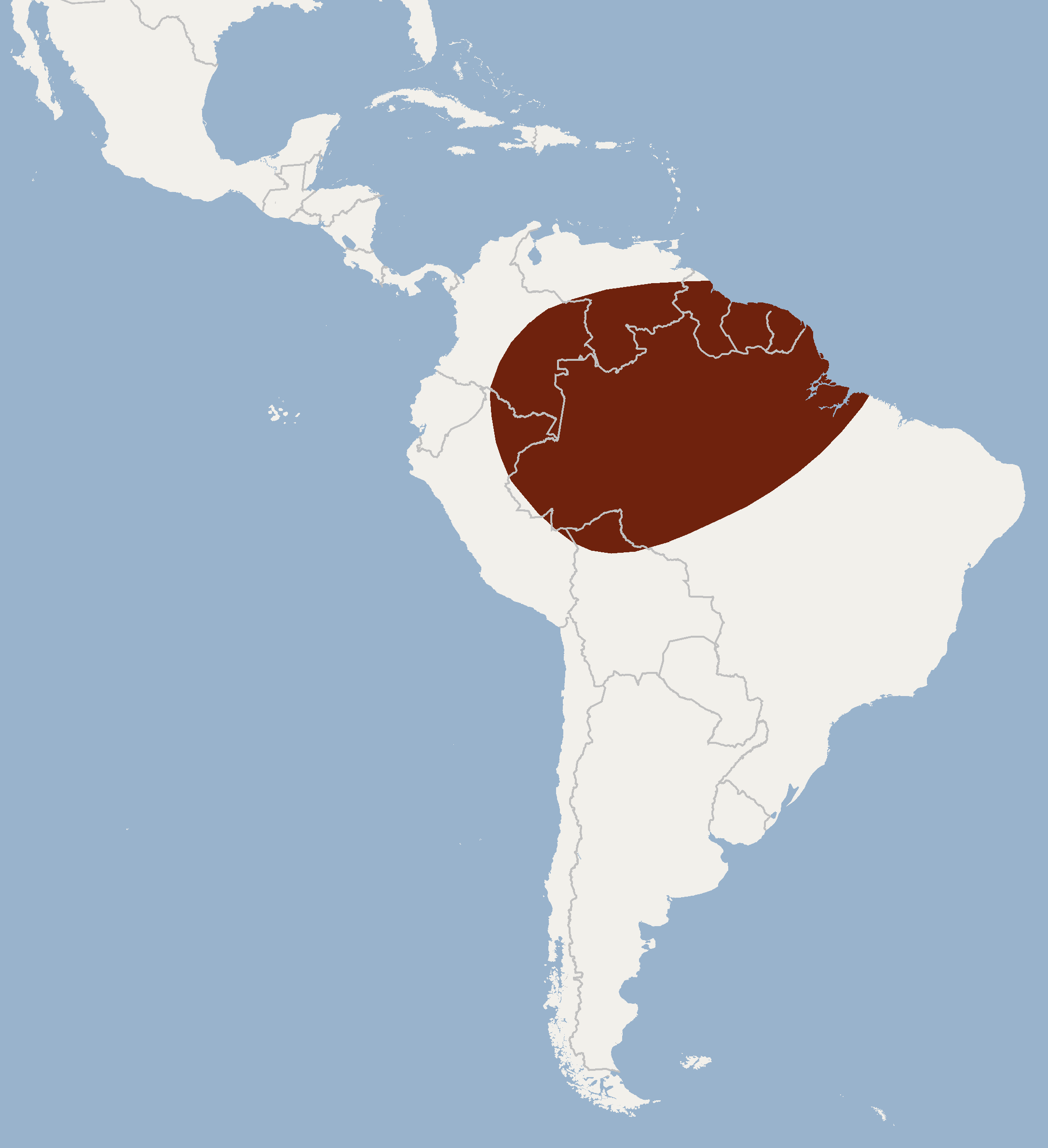

Synonyms
- Promops trumbulli Thomas, 1901

= Colombian bonneted bat =

Species of bat

The Colombian bonneted bat (Eumops trumbulli), also known as Trumbull's bonneted bat, is a bat species found in Bolivia, Brazil, Colombia, French Guiana, Guyana, Peru, Suriname and Venezuela.

== Taxonomy and etymology ==
It was described as a new species in 1901 by British naturalist Oldfield Thomas. Thomas initially placed it in the genus Promops, naming it Promops trumbulli. Thomas named it after Dr. J. Trumbull, who collected the holotype in May 1898 in Pará, Brazil. In 1906, Miller placed the species in his newly-coined genus Eumops, where it has remained. In 1932, Sanborn considered it a subspecies of the western mastiff bat, reclassifying it as Eumops perotis trumbulli. However, in 1977, Eger considered the Colombian bonneted bat a full species.

== Description ==
It is one of the larger members of its genus. It has a dental formula of 1.1.2.32.1.2.3 for a total of 30 teeth. In his initial description, Thomas wrote that it was similar in appearance to the western mastiff bat, but with smaller ears, smaller tragi, and lighter teeth. Its tragi are small and squarish—about as wide as they are tall.

== Conservation ==
It is currently evaluated as least concern by the IUCN—its lowest conservation priority. It meets the criteria for this assessment because of its large geographic range, presumably large population, and the fact that it is unlikely to be in rapid decline.
