= Eumops delticus =

Conservation status
- Data Deficient (IUCN 3.1)

Scientific classification
- Kingdom: Animalia
- Phylum: Chordata
- Class: Mammalia
- Order: Chiroptera
- Family: Molossidae
- Genus: Eumops
- Species: E. delticus

Binomial name
- Eumops delticus Thomas, 1923

Synonyms
- Eumops bonariensis delticus (Thomas, 1923)

Species of bat

Eumops delticus is a species of free-tailed bat found in South America.

== Taxonomy ==
Eumops delticus was described as a new species in 1923 by British mammalogist Oldfield Thomas. The holotype had been collected by Wilhelm Ehrhardt (1860–1936), a Guyana-born German animal collector. The type locality was the Brazilian island of Marajó. In 1932, Colin Campbell Sanborn published that E. delticus should be considered a subspecies of the dwarf bonneted bat (E. bonariensis). It was generally regarded as a subspecies until 2008 when Eger et al. published it as its own species again.

== Description ==
Based on the holotype, E. delticus individuals have a forearm length of around 47 mm (1.9 in), a head and body length of 68 mm (2.7 in), and a tail length of 41 mm (1.6 in).

== Range and habitat ==
E. delticus is found in the following South American countries: Brazil, Colombia, and Peru.

== Conservation ==
As of 2018, it is evaluated as a data deficient species by the IUCN. It meets the criteria for this classification because of ongoing uncertainty of its geographic range and ecological requirements.
