= Fred C. Babcock/Cecil M. Webb Wildlife Management Area =

Wildlife management area in Florida, United States

Fred C. Babcock/Cecil M. Webb Wildlife Management Area (WMA)
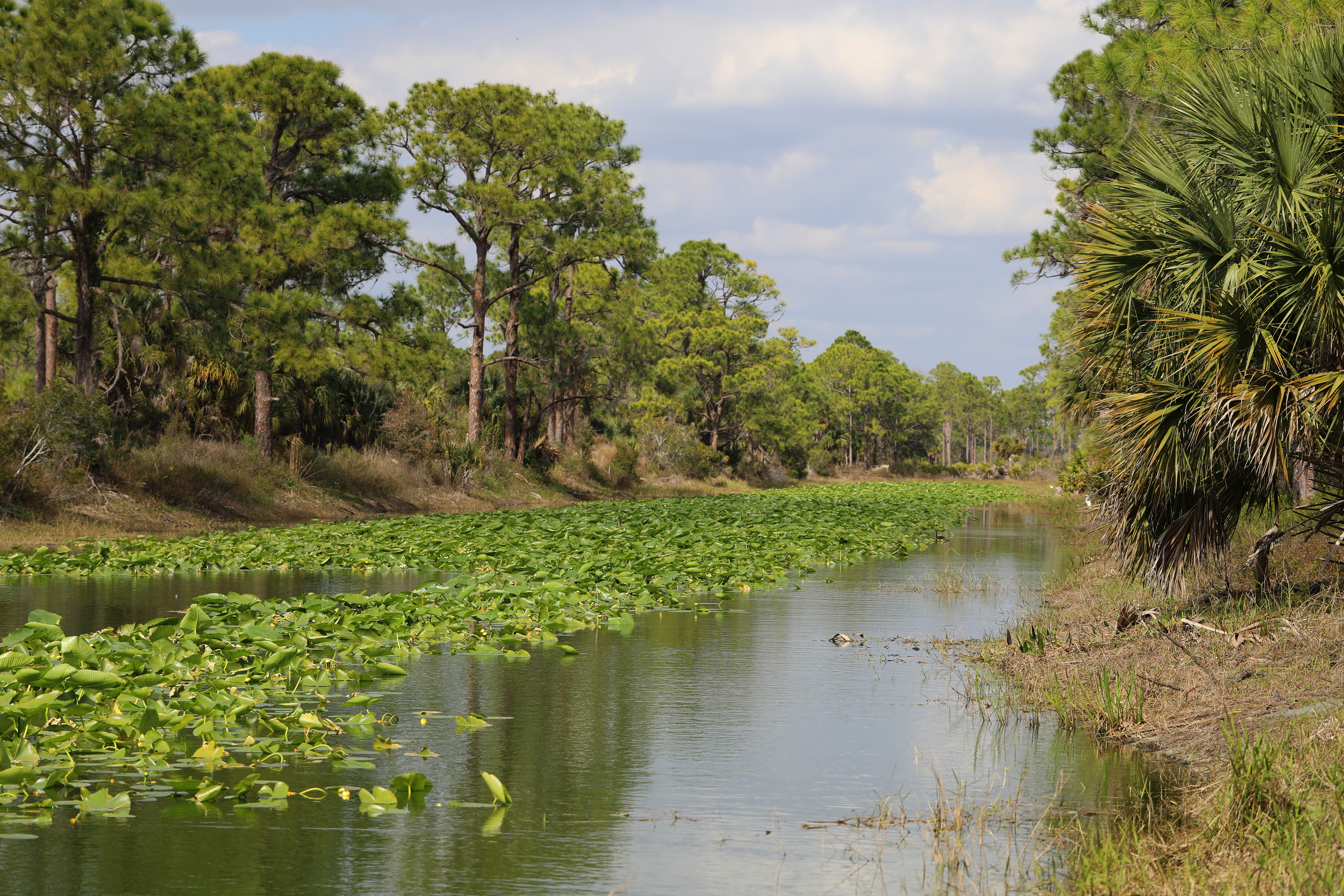
- Fred C. Babcock/ Cecil M. Webb Wildlife Management Area, January 2019

- Location within Florida
- Location: Charlotte County and Lee County, Florida
- Nearest city: Punta Gorda
- Coordinates: 26°52′45″N 81°52′51″W
- Area: 80,772 acres (32,687 ha)
- Governing body: Florida Fish and Wildlife Conservation Commission

Fred C. Babcock/Cecil M. Webb Wildlife Management Area (WMA) is Florida's oldest wildlife management area and protects 80,772 acres (32,687 ha) just southeast of Punta Gorda in Charlotte and Lee Counties, Florida. The area is accessed from its own exit off of Interstate-75.

== Fauna ==
The landscape-level of conserved habitat at this WMA serves as important habitat for a range of species in otherwise highly-developed southwest Florida. Federally-listed species such as Red-cockaded woodpecker, Florida bonneted bat, and Eastern indigo snake occupy this WMA. On rare occasions, Florida panthers have been sighted here. Numerous rare plants have also been recorded from the area.

== Recreational Activities ==
Hunting is popular at Fred C. Babcock/Cecil M. Webb Wildlife Management Area. white-tailed deer and Northern bobwhite populations continue to rise due to habitat management, and opportunities also exist to hunt mourning dove and feral hog. A shooting range is located close to the entrance and sees hundreds of visitors on the weekend. Anglers mainly fish 395-acre (160 ha) Webb Lake but also utilize the many ponds scattered throughout the property, but you must have a Florida fishing license if you’re 16 and up.

Specialty birds such as Red-cockaded woodpecker and Bachman's sparrow attract birders to this Great Florida Birding and Wildlife Trail site. Two hiking trails pass by ponds and marshes while several miles of unpaved roads allow bicyclers and horseback-riders to explore the area. Camping is available at the Webb Lake Campground.
