= Eumops chiribaya =

Scientific classification
- Domain: Eukaryota
- Kingdom: Animalia
- Phylum: Chordata
- Class: Mammalia
- Order: Chiroptera
- Family: Molossidae
- Genus: Eumops
- Species: E. chiribaya

Binomial name
- Eumops chiribaya Medina, Gregorin, Zeballos, Zamora, & Moras, 2014

Species of bat

Eumops chiribaya is a species of free-tailed bat found in Peru.

== Taxonomy ==
Eumops chiribaya was described as a new species in 2014 by Medina et al. The holotype had been collected in 2010 in El Algarrobal, Peru. Its species name "chiribaya" refers to the Chiribayans, who were indigenous Peruvians.

== Description ==
Eumops chiribaya is considered a medium-sized member of its genus. The holotype (an adult female) had a forearm length of 61.1 mm (2.41 in) and a weight of 20.3 g (0.72 oz). An adult male specimen had a forearm length of 62.1 mm (2.44 in) and a weight of 30.0 g (1.06 oz). It can be distinguished from other bats in Peru by its lack of a nose-leaf, tail extending beyond the edge of the uropatagium, large antitragus, reduced tragus, ears joined over the forehead, smooth upper lip, and ears longer than 20 mm (0.79 in).

== Range and habitat ==
Eumops chiribaya is endemic to Peru. It has been documented in the type locality of El Algarrobal as well as the Ocoña Valley in the Department of Arequipa. It might be found at elevations from 111–743 m (364–2,438 ft) above sea level.
