= Nepal myotis =

Conservation status
- Least Concern (IUCN 3.1)

Scientific classification
- Kingdom: Animalia
- Phylum: Chordata
- Class: Mammalia
- Order: Chiroptera
- Family: Vespertilionidae
- Genus: Myotis
- Species: M. nipalensis

Binomial name
- Myotis nipalensis Dobson, 1871
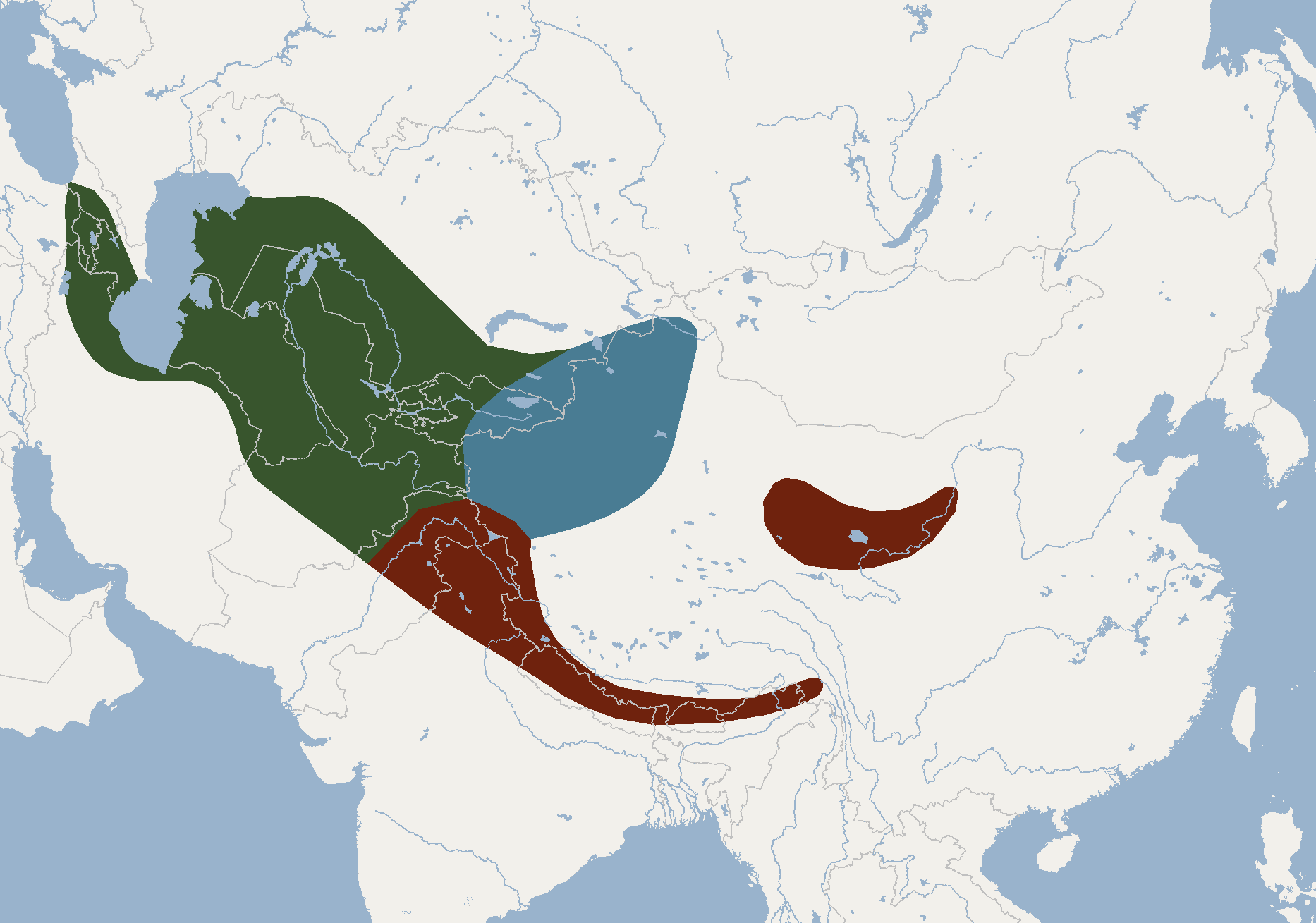

Species of bat

The Nepal myotis (Myotis nipalensis) is a vesper bat of genus Myotis.

== Description ==
They are small, with the total length less than 10 centimetres (4 in) and wing span less than 4 centimetres (2 in). It has a small ear and long narrow tragus. It has dense pelage the dorsal pelage is basally dark and dark tipped, ventral pelage is also dark but with paler tips.

== Reproduction ==
They reproduce once a year giving birth to a single offspring.

== Distribution ==
They are endemic to Asia and are found from Iran to Siberia.

== Habitat ==
They are found in both high and low altitude regions. They inhabit a variety of habitats including arid regions mountainous regions and forests.

== Diet ==
They mainly fest on lepidopterans. They hunt at dusk.

== Subspecies ==
Mammal Species of the World lists three subspecies:

- Myotis nipalensis nipalensis (Dobson, 1871)
- Myotis nipalensis przewalskii (Bobrinski, 1926)
- Myotis nipalensis transcaspicus (Ognev & Heptner, 1928)
