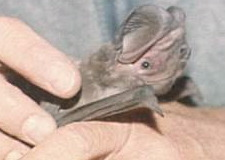

Conservation status
- Least Concern (IUCN 3.1)

Scientific classification
- Kingdom: Animalia
- Phylum: Chordata
- Class: Mammalia
- Infraclass: Placentalia
- Order: Chiroptera
- Family: Molossidae
- Genus: Eumops
- Species: E. perotis

Binomial name
- Eumops perotis Schinz, 1821
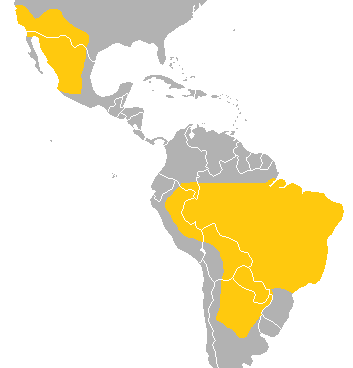
- Geographic Range

= Western mastiff bat =

Species of bat

The western mastiff bat (Eumops perotis), also known as the western bonneted bat, the greater mastiff bat, or the greater bonneted bat, is a member of the free-tailed bat family, Molossidae. It is found in the Western United States, Mexico, and South America. This species is the largest bat native to North America, and some of its distinguishing characteristics are its large ears, wings, and forearms. The subspecies E. p. californicus is a species of concern as identified by the U.S. Fish and Wildlife Service. The range of this subspecies is principally southwest desert regions of the United States, along the border with Mexico; however, the range extends as far north on the Pacific coast as Alameda County, California.

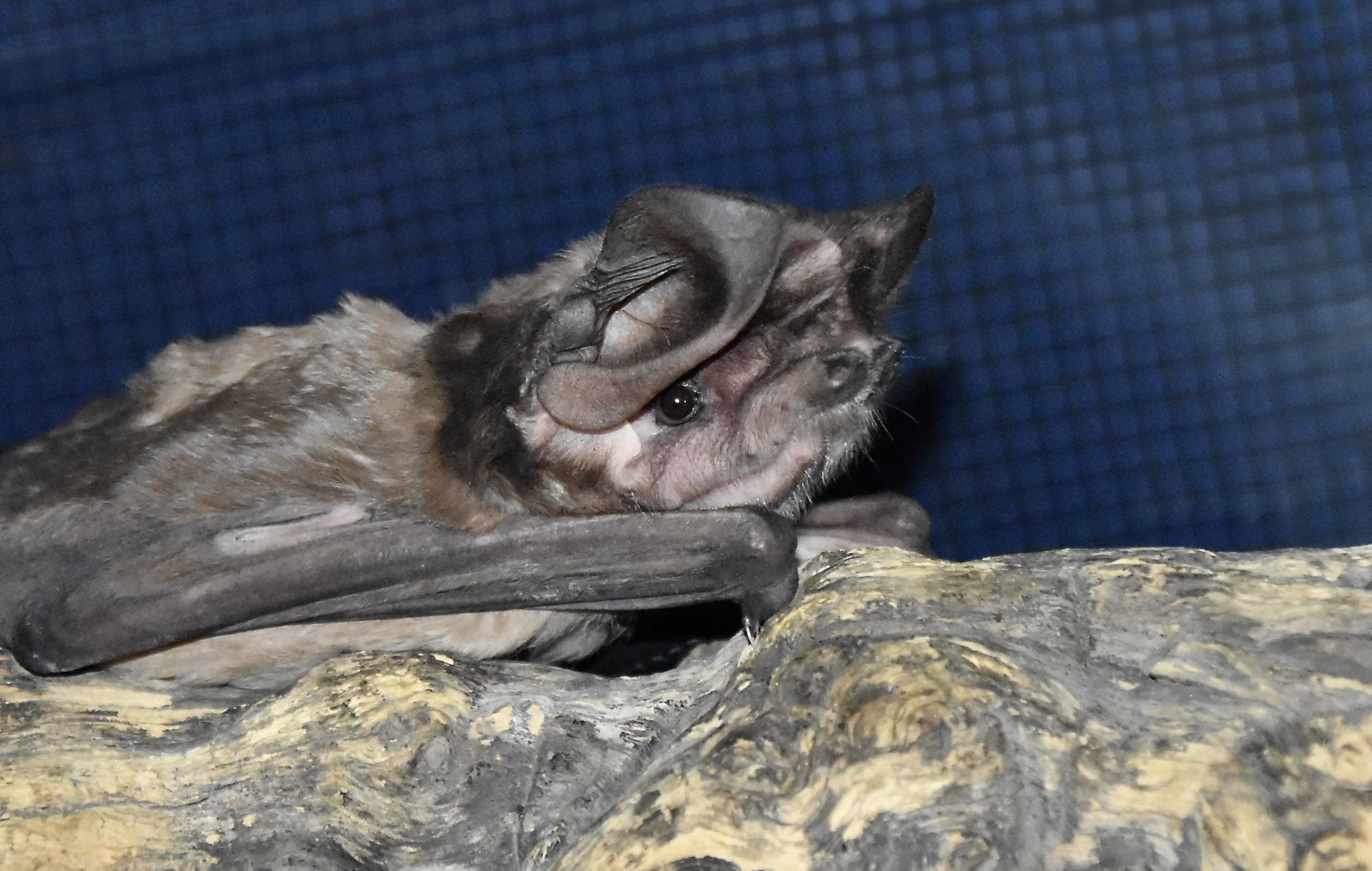
At a bat rescue center in Arizona.

== Range and habitat ==
The western mastiff bat is located in both South and North America. In South America, the species is found in Brazil and its neighboring countries, ranging southward to northern Argentina. It can also be found in Cuba. The subspecies in North America, E. p. californicus, resides in the Southwestern United States (California, Arizona, New Mexico, and Texas) and ranges southward to parts of central Mexico.

The greater mastiff bat prefers to live in habitats with open space. Some examples include desert scrub, woodlands, and grasslands. Roosts are commonly located in crevices of rocky areas, such as cliffs and canyons, and have also been found within man-made structures such as buildings and tunnels. As the western mastiff bat cannot take off from flat surfaces, these spots are at least 3 m (10 ft) above ground, providing the bat with sufficient space to drop from and take flight.

== Description ==
Eumops perotis is most notable for its size, as it is the largest North American bat. It has a body length of 6.2 to 7.2 in (16 to 18 cm) and a wingspan over 22 in (56 cm). The weight of this species can range from 60 to 70 g (2.1 to 2.5 oz). The wings are long yet narrow, which limits the species' maneuverability in the air. A defining characteristic is its large ears that range between 1.4 and 1.85 in (3.6 and 4.7 cm) and extend over the bat's snout. It also has large forearms with a length of 2.9 to 3.3 in (7.4 to 8.4 cm). Males are larger than females and also have an odoriferous gland on their throats, which is less developed in females. The western mastiff bat is mostly dark in color, as the body is primarily brown or gray, though the underside is a lighter color.

== Ecology and behavior ==
Western mastiff bats are nocturnal, leaving roosts at night to feed. Unlike most North American bats, they do not undergo either migration or prolonged hibernation, but are periodically active all winter. The size of colonies varies, but they usually consist of less than 100 bats. Males and females live together yearly, even during maternity periods.

The species is very active at night, spending 6–7 hours flying a night for a total distance around 14.9 mi (24.0 km). Its long, narrow wings allow the bat to maintain flight at high speeds for long periods of time. These bats can reach heights of 196 ft (60 m), though they are also observed flying closer to the ground. One notable characteristic of this species is its high-pitched echolocation call, as it can be heard from heights of 990 ft (300 m).

=== Diet ===
The western mastiff bat mainly feeds on small insects. Moths are its biggest food source, but it has been observed to eat beetles, ants, dragonflies, crickets, and grasshoppers.

=== Reproduction ===
This species begins mating in early spring and the offspring are born in the summer, usually by July. The gestation period is about 80–90 days, and females give birth to one offspring at a time, though twins are possible. The parturition period varies greatly. The young remain in a nursery after birth, with both the males and females.

== Conservation ==
Though the western mastiff bat is listed as least concern by the IUCN Red List of Threatened Species, Bat Conservation International reports that its numbers are decreasing in certain areas. One reason for its decline is its inability to find suitable water sites for drinking, as its size prevents it from drinking from small bodies of water. Grazing and the use of pesticides have impacted foraging habitats. The loss of cliff sites as a result of urban/suburban development and activities such as water impoundments, highway building, and quarry operations has also contributed to the species' endangered status, making adequate roost places harder to find.
