= List of mammals of Zimbabwe =

This is a list of the mammal species recorded in Zimbabwe. There are 199 mammal species in Zimbabwe, of which one is critically endangered, one is endangered, eight are vulnerable, and ten are near threatened.

The following tags are used to highlight each species' conservation status as assessed by the International Union for Conservation of Nature:

EX	Extinct	No reasonable doubt that the last individual has died.
EW	Extinct in the wild	Known only to survive in captivity or as a naturalized populations well outside its previous range.
CR	Critically endangered	The species is in imminent risk of extinction in the wild.
EN	Endangered	The species is facing an extremely high risk of extinction in the wild.
VU	Vulnerable	The species is facing a high risk of extinction in the wild.
NT	Near threatened	The species does not meet any of the criteria that would categorise it as risking extinction but it is likely to do so in the future.
LC	Least concern	There are no current identifiable risks to the species.
DD	Data deficient	There is inadequate information to make an assessment of the risks to this species.

Some species were assessed using an earlier set of criteria. Species assessed using this system have the following instead of near threatened and least concern categories:

LR/cd	Lower risk/conservation dependent	Species which were the focus of conservation programmes and may have moved into a higher risk category if that programme was discontinued.
LR/nt	Lower risk/near threatened	Species which are close to being classified as vulnerable but are not the subject of conservation programmes.
LR/lc	Lower risk/least concern	Species for which there are no identifiable risks.

== Order: Afrosoricida (tenrecs and golden moles) ==
The order Afrosoricida contains the golden moles of southern Africa and the tenrecs of Madagascar and Africa, two families of small mammals that were traditionally part of the order Insectivora.

- Family: Chrysochloridae
  - Subfamily: Chrysochlorinae
    - Genus: Carpitalpa
      - Golden mole, Carpitalpa arendsi VU
  - Subfamily: Amblysominae
    - Genus: Calcochloris
      - Yellow golden mole, Calcochloris obtusirostris LC

== Order: Macroscelidea (elephant shrews) ==
Often called sengis, elephant shrews are native to southern Africa. Their common English name derives from their elongated flexible snout and their resemblance to the true shrews.

- Family: Macroscelididae (elephant shrews)
  - Genus: Elephantulus
    - Short-snouted elephant shrew, Elephantulus brachyrhynchus LC
    - Eastern rock elephant shrew, Elephantulus myurus LC
  - Genus: Petrodromus
    - Four-toed elephant shrew, Petrodromus tetradactylus LC

== Order: Tubulidentata (aardvarks) ==
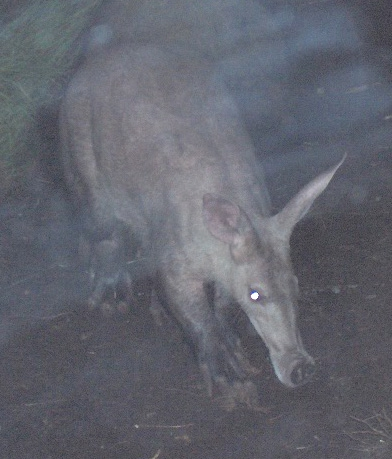
Aardvark

The order Tubulidentata consists of a single species, the aardvark. Tubulidentata are characterised by their teeth which lack a pulp cavity and form thin tubes which are continuously worn down and replaced.

- Family: Orycteropodidae
  - Genus: Orycteropus
    - Aardvark, O. afer LC

== Order: Hyracoidea (hyraxes) ==
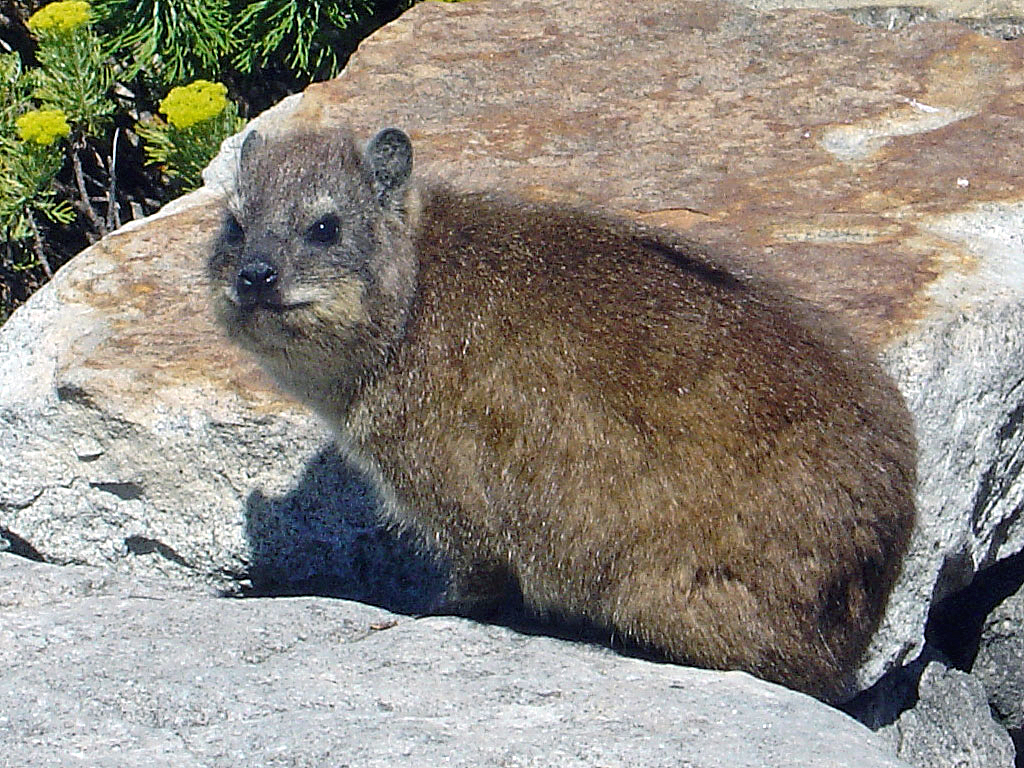
Cape hyrax

The hyraxes are any of four species of fairly small, thickset, herbivorous mammals in the order Hyracoidea. About the size of a domestic cat they are well-furred, with rounded bodies and a stumpy tail. They are native to Africa and the Middle East.

- Family: Procaviidae (hyraxes)
  - Genus: Dendrohyrax
    - Southern tree hyrax, D. arboreus LC
  - Genus: Heterohyrax
    - Yellow-spotted rock hyrax, H. brucei LC
  - Genus: Procavia
    - Cape hyrax, P. capensis LC

== Order: Proboscidea (elephants) ==
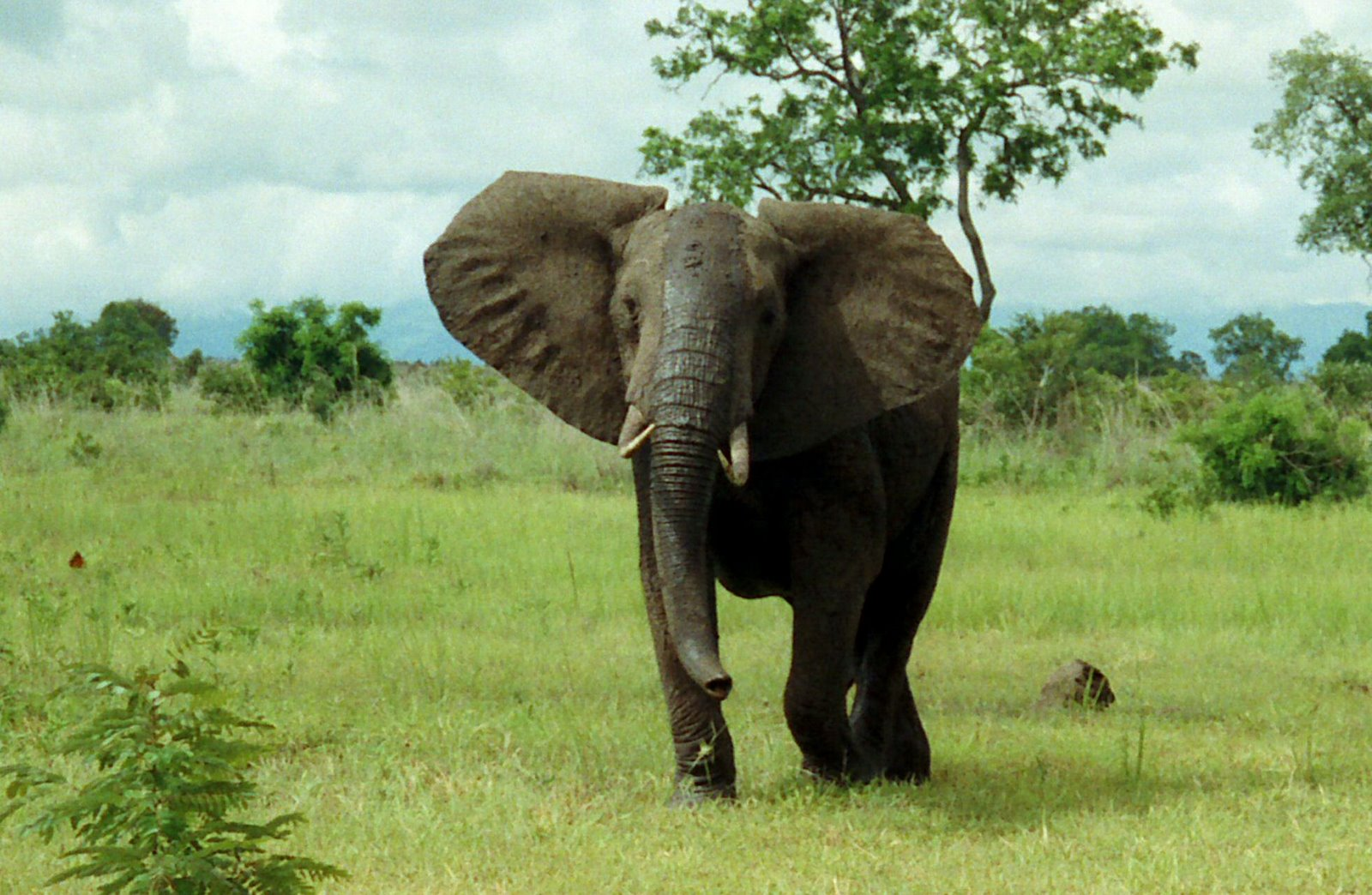
African bush elephant

Elephants comprise three living species and are the largest living land animals.

- Family: Elephantidae (elephants)
  - Genus: Loxodonta
    - African bush elephant, L. africana EN

== Order: Primates ==
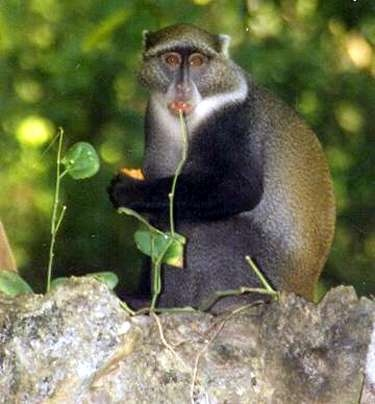
Sykes' monkey

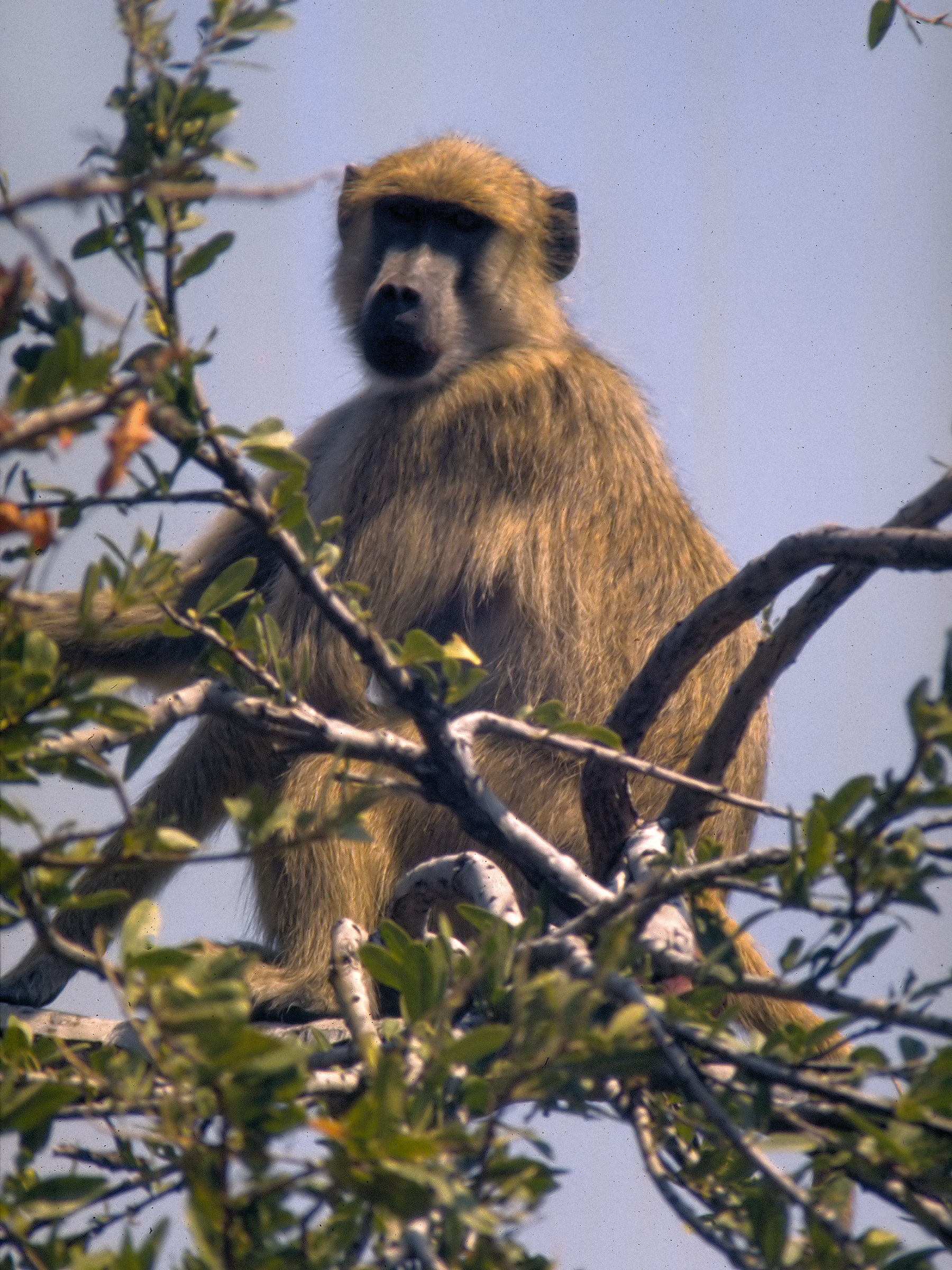
Chacma baboon

The order Primates contains humans and their closest relatives: lemurs, lorisoids, tarsiers, monkeys, and apes.

- Suborder: Strepsirrhini
  - Infraorder: Lemuriformes
    - Superfamily: Lorisoidea
      - Family: Galagidae
        - Genus: Galagoides
          - Grant's bushbaby, Galagoides granti DD
          - Zanzibar bushbaby, Galagoides zanzibaricus LR/nt
        - Genus: Galago
          - Mohol bushbaby, Galago moholi LR/lc
        - Genus: Otolemur
          - Brown greater galago, Otolemur crassicaudatus LR/lc
- Suborder: Haplorhini
  - Infraorder: Simiiformes
    - Parvorder: Catarrhini
      - Superfamily: Cercopithecoidea
        - Family: Cercopithecidae (Old World monkeys)
          - Genus: Chlorocebus
            - Vervet monkey, Chlorocebus pygerythrus LR/lc
          - Genus: Cercopithecus
            - Sykes' monkey, Cercopithecus albogularis LR/lc
          - Genus: Papio
            - Chacma baboon, Papio ursinus LR/lc

== Order: Rodentia (rodents) ==
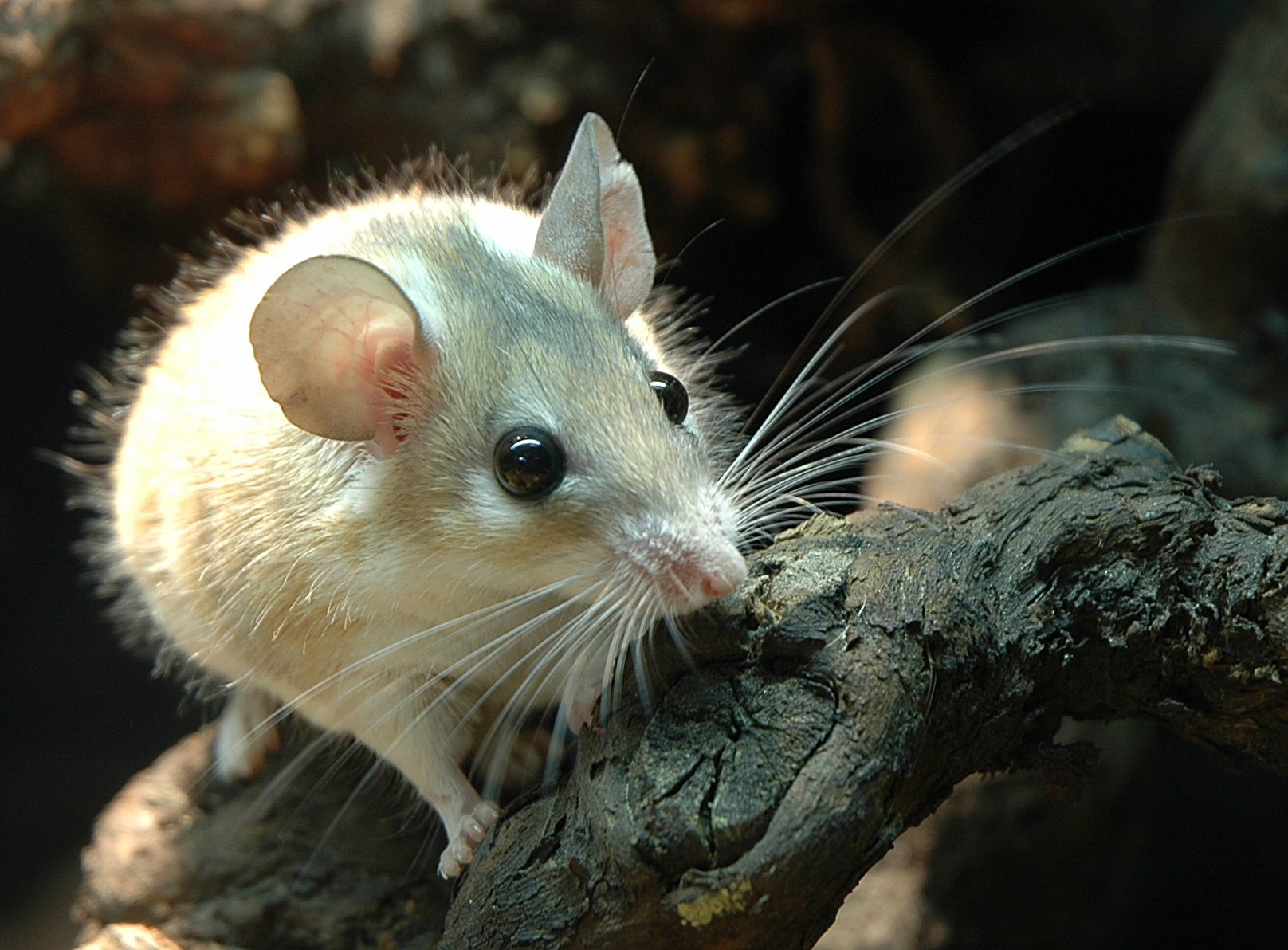
Spiny mouse

Rodents make up the largest order of mammals, with over 40% of mammalian species. They have two incisors in the upper and lower jaw which grow continually and must be kept short by gnawing. Most rodents are small though the capybara can weigh up to 45 kg (99 lb).

- Suborder: Hystricognathi
  - Family: Bathyergidae
    - Genus: Cryptomys
      - Damaraland mole-rat, Cryptomys damarensis LC
      - Mashona mole-rat, Cryptomys darlingi LC
      - Common mole-rat, Cryptomys hottentotus LC
    - Genus: Heliophobius
      - Silvery mole-rat, Heliophobius argenteocinereus LC
  - Family: Hystricidae (Old World porcupines)
    - Genus: Hystrix
      - Cape porcupine, Hystrix africaeaustralis LC
  - Family: Thryonomyidae (cane rats)
    - Genus: Thryonomys
      - Lesser cane rat, Thryonomys gregorianus LC
      - Greater cane rat, Thryonomys swinderianus LC
- Suborder: Sciurognathi
  - Family: Pedetidae (spring hare)
    - Genus: Pedetes
      - Springhare, Pedetes capensis LC
  - Family: Sciuridae (squirrels)
    - Subfamily: Xerinae
      - Tribe: Xerini
        - Genus: Xerus
          - South African ground squirrel, Xerus inauris LC
      - Tribe: Protoxerini
        - Genus: Heliosciurus
          - Mutable sun squirrel, Heliosciurus mutabilis LC
        - Genus: Paraxerus
          - Smith's bush squirrel, Paraxerus cepapi LC
          - Red bush squirrel, Paraxerus palliatus LC
  - Family: Gliridae (dormice)
    - Subfamily: Graphiurinae
      - Genus: Graphiurus
        - Johnston's African dormouse, Graphiurus johnstoni DD
        - Small-eared dormouse, Graphiurus microtis LC
        - Rock dormouse, Graphiurus platyops LC
  - Family: Nesomyidae
    - Subfamily: Dendromurinae
      - Genus: Dendromus
        - Gray climbing mouse, Dendromus melanotis LC
        - Chestnut climbing mouse, Dendromus mystacalis LC
        - Nyika climbing mouse, Dendromus nyikae LC
      - Genus: Steatomys
        - Tiny fat mouse, Steatomys parvus LC
        - Fat mouse, Steatomys pratensis LC
    - Subfamily: Cricetomyinae
      - Genus: Cricetomys
        - Gambian pouched rat, Cricetomys gambianus LC
      - Genus: Saccostomus
        - South African pouched mouse, Saccostomus campestris LC
  - Family: Muridae (mice, rats, voles, gerbils, hamsters, etc.)
    - Subfamily: Deomyinae
      - Genus: Acomys
        - Spiny mouse, Acomys spinosissimus LC
      - Genus: Uranomys
        - Rudd's mouse, Uranomys ruddi LC
    - Subfamily: Otomyinae
      - Genus: Otomys
        - Angoni vlei rat, Otomys angoniensis LC
        - Southern African vlei rat, Otomys irroratus LC
    - Subfamily: Gerbillinae
      - Genus: Gerbillurus
        - Hairy-footed gerbil, Gerbillurus paeba LC
      - Genus: Tatera
        - Highveld gerbil, Tatera brantsii LC
        - Gorongoza gerbil, Tatera inclusa LC
        - Bushveld gerbil, Tatera leucogaster LC
        - Savanna gerbil, Tatera valida LC
    - Subfamily: Murinae
      - Genus: Aethomys
        - Red rock rat, Aethomys chrysophilus LC
        - Namaqua rock rat, Aethomys namaquensis LC
        - Silinda rock rat, Aethomys silindensis VU
      - Genus: Dasymys
        - African marsh rat, Dasymys incomtus LC
      - Genus: Grammomys
        - Mozambique thicket rat, Grammomys cometes LC
        - Woodland thicket rat, Grammomys dolichurus LC
      - Genus: Lemniscomys
        - Single-striped grass mouse, Lemniscomys rosalia LC
      - Genus: Mastomys
        - Southern multimammate mouse, Mastomys coucha LC
        - Natal multimammate mouse, Mastomys natalensis LC
      - Genus: Mus
        - Desert pygmy mouse, Mus indutus LC
        - African pygmy mouse, Mus minutoides LC
        - Neave's mouse, Mus neavei DD
      - Genus: Pelomys
        - Creek groove-toothed swamp rat, Pelomys fallax LC
      - Genus: Rhabdomys
        - Four-striped grass mouse, Rhabdomys pumilio LC
      - Genus: Thallomys
        - Acacia rat, Thallomys paedulcus LC

== Order: Lagomorpha (lagomorphs) ==
The lagomorphs comprise two families, Leporidae (hares and rabbits), and Ochotonidae (pikas). Though they can resemble rodents, and were classified as a superfamily in that order until the early 20th century, they have since been considered a separate order. They differ from rodents in a number of physical characteristics, such as having four incisors in the upper jaw rather than two.

- Family: Leporidae (rabbits, hares)
  - Genus: Pronolagus
    - Jameson's red rock hare, Pronolagus randensis LR/lc
  - Genus: Lepus
    - Cape hare, Lepus capensis LR/lc
    - African savanna hare, Lepus microtis LR/lc

== Order: Erinaceomorpha (hedgehogs and gymnures) ==
The order Erinaceomorpha contains a single family, Erinaceidae, which comprise the hedgehogs and gymnures. The hedgehogs are easily recognised by their spines while gymnures look more like large rats.

- Family: Erinaceidae (hedgehogs)
  - Subfamily: Erinaceinae
    - Genus: Atelerix
      - Southern African hedgehog, Atelerix frontalis LR/lc

== Order: Soricomorpha (shrews, moles, and solenodons) ==
The "shrew-forms" of order Soricomorpha are insectivorous mammals. The shrews and solenodons closely resemble mice while the moles are stout-bodied burrowers.

- Family: Soricidae (shrews)
  - Subfamily: Crocidurinae
    - Genus: Crocidura
      - Reddish-gray musk shrew, Crocidura cyanea LC
      - Bicolored musk shrew, Crocidura fuscomurina LC
      - Lesser red musk shrew, Crocidura hirta LC
      - Moonshine shrew, Crocidura luna LC
      - Makwassie musk shrew, Crocidura maquassiensis LC
      - African giant shrew, Crocidura olivieri LC
      - Lesser gray-brown musk shrew, Crocidura silacea LC
    - Genus: Suncus
      - Greater dwarf shrew, Suncus lixus LC
      - Lesser dwarf shrew, Suncus varilla LC
    - Genus: Sylvisorex
      - Climbing shrew, Sylvisorex megalura LC
  - Subfamily: Myosoricinae
    - Genus: Myosorex
      - Dark-footed mouse shrew, Myosorex cafer LC

== Order: Chiroptera (bats) ==
The bats' most distinguishing feature is that their forelimbs are developed as wings, making them the only mammals capable of flight. Bat species account for about 20% of all mammals.

- Family: Pteropodidae (flying foxes, Old World fruit bats)
  - Subfamily: Pteropodinae
    - Genus: Eidolon
      - Straw-coloured fruit bat, Eidolon helvum LC
    - Genus: Epomophorus
      - Peters's epauletted fruit bat, Epomophorus crypturus LC
      - Wahlberg's epauletted fruit bat, Epomophorus wahlbergi LC
    - Genus: Myonycteris
      - East African little collared fruit bat, Myonycteris relicta VU
    - Genus: Rousettus
      - Egyptian fruit bat, Rousettus aegyptiacus LC
- Family: Vespertilionidae
  - Subfamily: Kerivoulinae
    - Genus: Kerivoula
      - Damara woolly bat, Kerivoula argentata LC
      - Lesser woolly bat, Kerivoula lanosa LC
  - Subfamily: Myotinae
    - Genus: Myotis
      - Rufous mouse-eared bat, Myotis bocagii LC
      - Cape hairy bat, Myotis tricolor LC
      - Welwitsch's bat, Myotis welwitschii LC
  - Subfamily: Vespertilioninae
    - Genus: Eptesicus
      - Long-tailed house bat, Eptesicus hottentotus LC
    - Genus: Glauconycteris
      - Butterfly bat, Glauconycteris variegata LC
    - Genus: Hypsugo
      - Anchieta's pipistrelle, Hypsugo anchietae LC
    - Genus: Laephotis
      - Botswanan long-eared bat, Laephotis botswanae LC
    - Genus: Neoromicia
      - Cape serotine, Neoromicia capensis LC
      - Melck's house bat, Neoromicia melckorum DD
      - Banana pipistrelle, Neoromicia nanus LC
      - Somali serotine, Neoromicia somalicus LC
      - Zulu serotine, Neoromicia zuluensis LC
    - Genus: Nycticeinops
      - Schlieffen's bat, Nycticeinops schlieffeni LC
    - Genus: Pipistrellus
      - Rüppell's pipistrelle, Pipistrellus rueppelli LC
      - Rusty pipistrelle, Pipistrellus rusticus LC
    - Genus: Scotophilus
      - African yellow bat, Scotophilus dinganii LC
      - Schreber's yellow bat, Scotophilus nigrita NT
      - Greenish yellow bat, Scotophilus viridis LC
  - Subfamily: Miniopterinae
    - Genus: Miniopterus
      - Lesser long-fingered bat, Miniopterus fraterculus LC
      - Greater long-fingered bat, Miniopterus inflatus LC
      - Natal long-fingered bat, Miniopterus natalensis NT
- Family: Molossidae
  - Genus: Chaerephon
    - Ansorge's free-tailed bat, Chaerephon ansorgei LC
    - Spotted free-tailed bat, Chaerephon bivittata LC
    - Nigerian free-tailed bat, Chaerephon nigeriae LC
    - Little free-tailed bat, Chaerephon pumila LC
  - Genus: Mops
    - Angolan free-tailed bat, Mops condylurus LC
    - Midas free-tailed bat, Mops midas LC
  - Genus: Otomops
    - Large-eared free-tailed bat, Otomops martiensseni NT
  - Genus: Sauromys
    - Roberts's flat-headed bat, Sauromys petrophilus LC
  - Genus: Tadarida
    - Egyptian free-tailed bat, Tadarida aegyptiaca LC
    - Madagascan large free-tailed bat, Tadarida fulminans LC
    - Kenyan big-eared free-tailed bat, Tadarida lobata DD
    - African giant free-tailed bat, Tadarida ventralis NT
- Family: Emballonuridae
  - Genus: Taphozous
    - Mauritian tomb bat, Taphozous mauritianus LC
    - Egyptian tomb bat, Taphozous perforatus LC
- Family: Nycteridae
  - Genus: Nycteris
    - Hairy slit-faced bat, Nycteris hispida LC
    - Large-eared slit-faced bat, Nycteris macrotis LC
    - Egyptian slit-faced bat, Nycteris thebaica LC
    - Wood's slit-faced bat, Nycteris woodi NT
- Family: Rhinolophidae
  - Subfamily: Rhinolophinae
    - Genus: Rhinolophus
      - Blasius's horseshoe bat, Rhinolophus blasii NT
      - Geoffroy's horseshoe bat, Rhinolophus clivosus LC
      - Darling's horseshoe bat, Rhinolophus darlingi LC
      - Dent's horseshoe bat, Rhinolophus denti DD
      - Rüppell's horseshoe bat, Rhinolophus fumigatus LC
      - Hildebrandt's horseshoe bat, Rhinolophus hildebrandti LC
      - Lander's horseshoe bat, Rhinolophus landeri LC
      - Bushveld horseshoe bat, Rhinolophus simulator LC
      - Swinny's horseshoe bat, Rhinolophus swinnyi NT
  - Subfamily: Hipposiderinae
    - Genus: Cloeotis
      - Percival's trident bat, Cloeotis percivali VU
    - Genus: Hipposideros
      - Sundevall's roundleaf bat, Hipposideros caffer LC
      - Commerson's roundleaf bat, Hipposideros marungensis NT
    - Genus: Triaenops
      - Persian trident bat, Triaenops persicus LC

== Order: Pholidota (pangolins) ==
The order Pholidota comprises the eight species of pangolin. Pangolins are anteaters and have the powerful claws, elongated snout and long tongue seen in the other unrelated anteater species.

- Family: Manidae
  - Genus: Manis
    - Ground pangolin, Manis temminckii LR/nt

== Order: Carnivora (carnivorans) ==
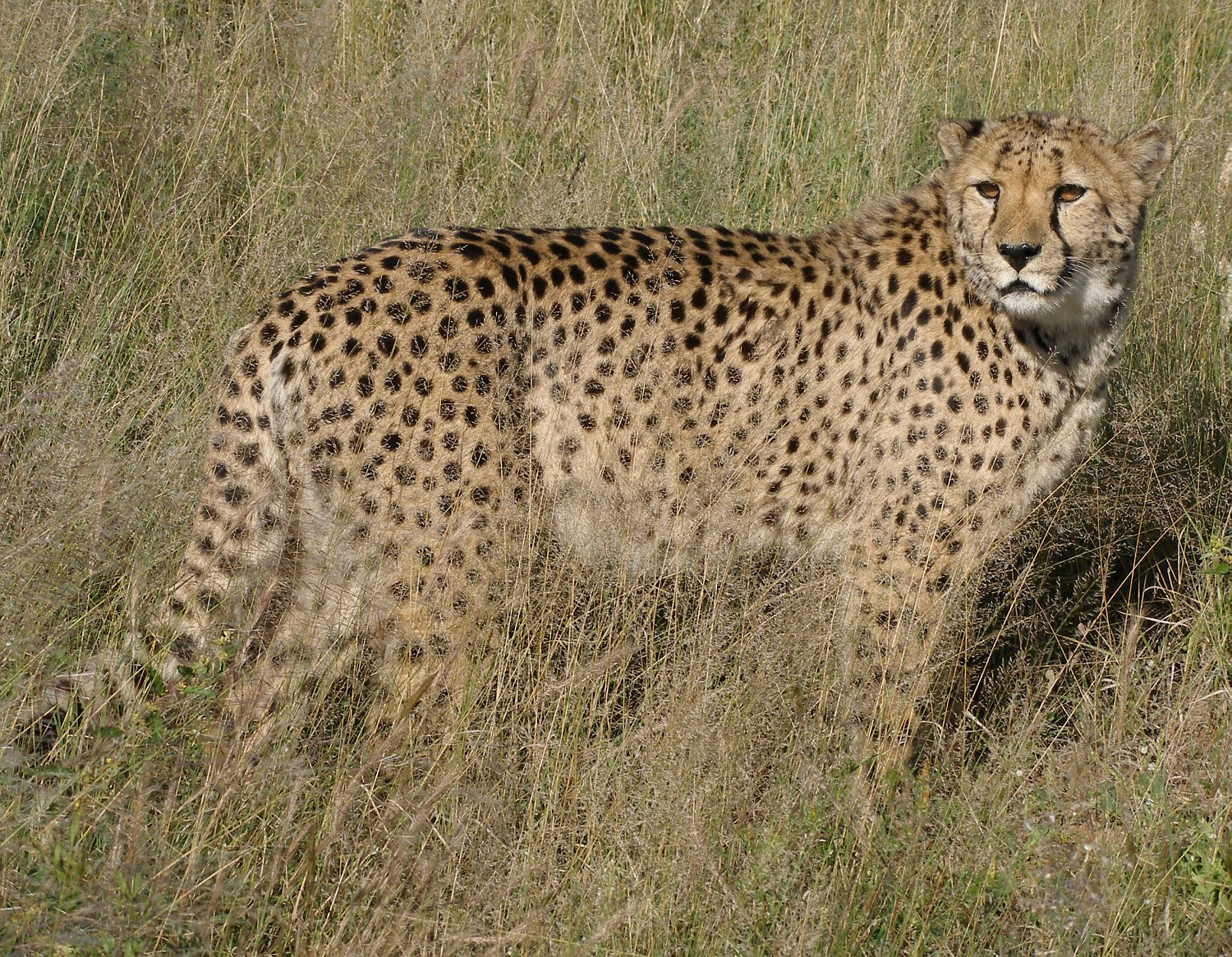
Cheetah

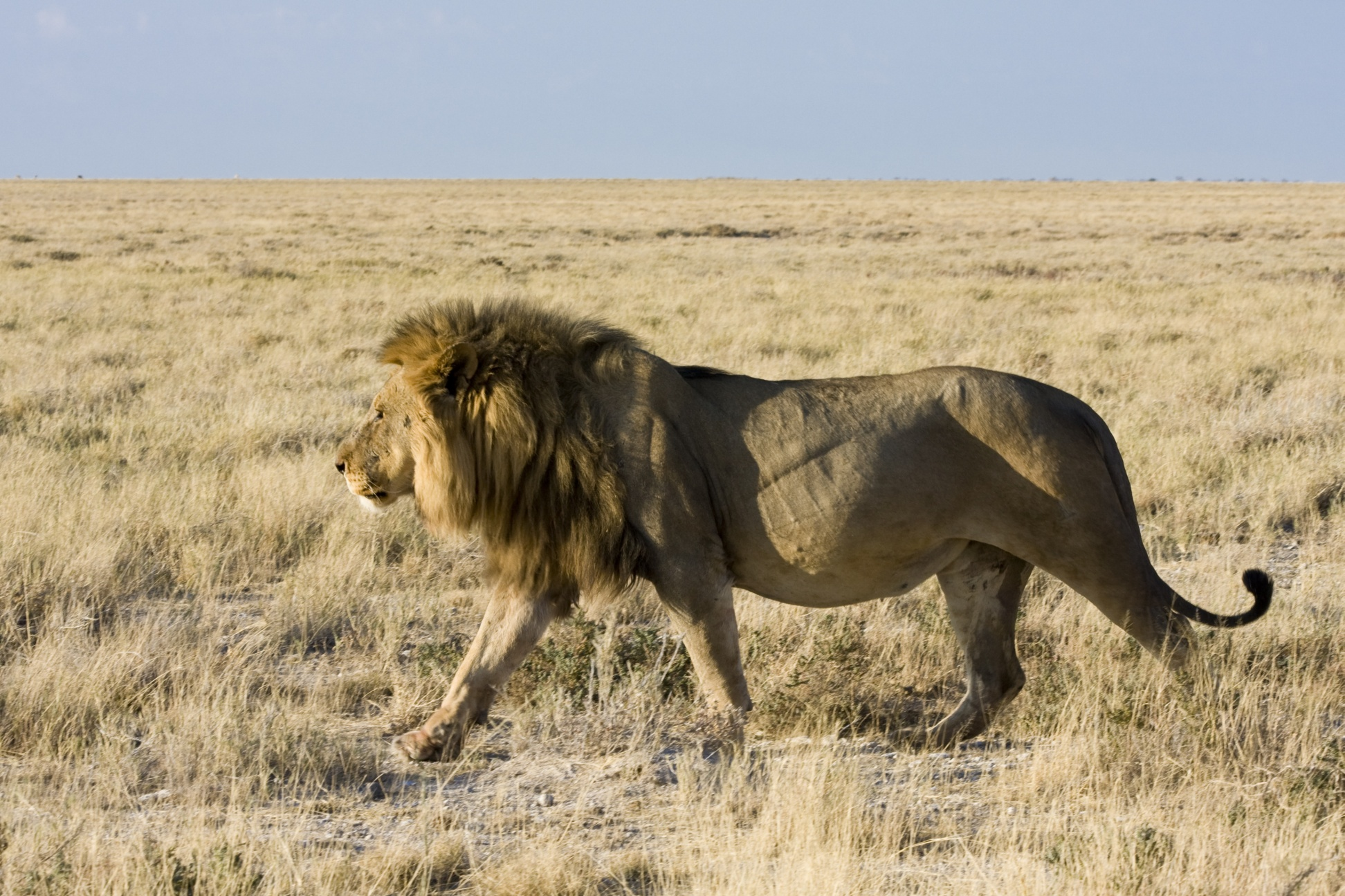
Lion

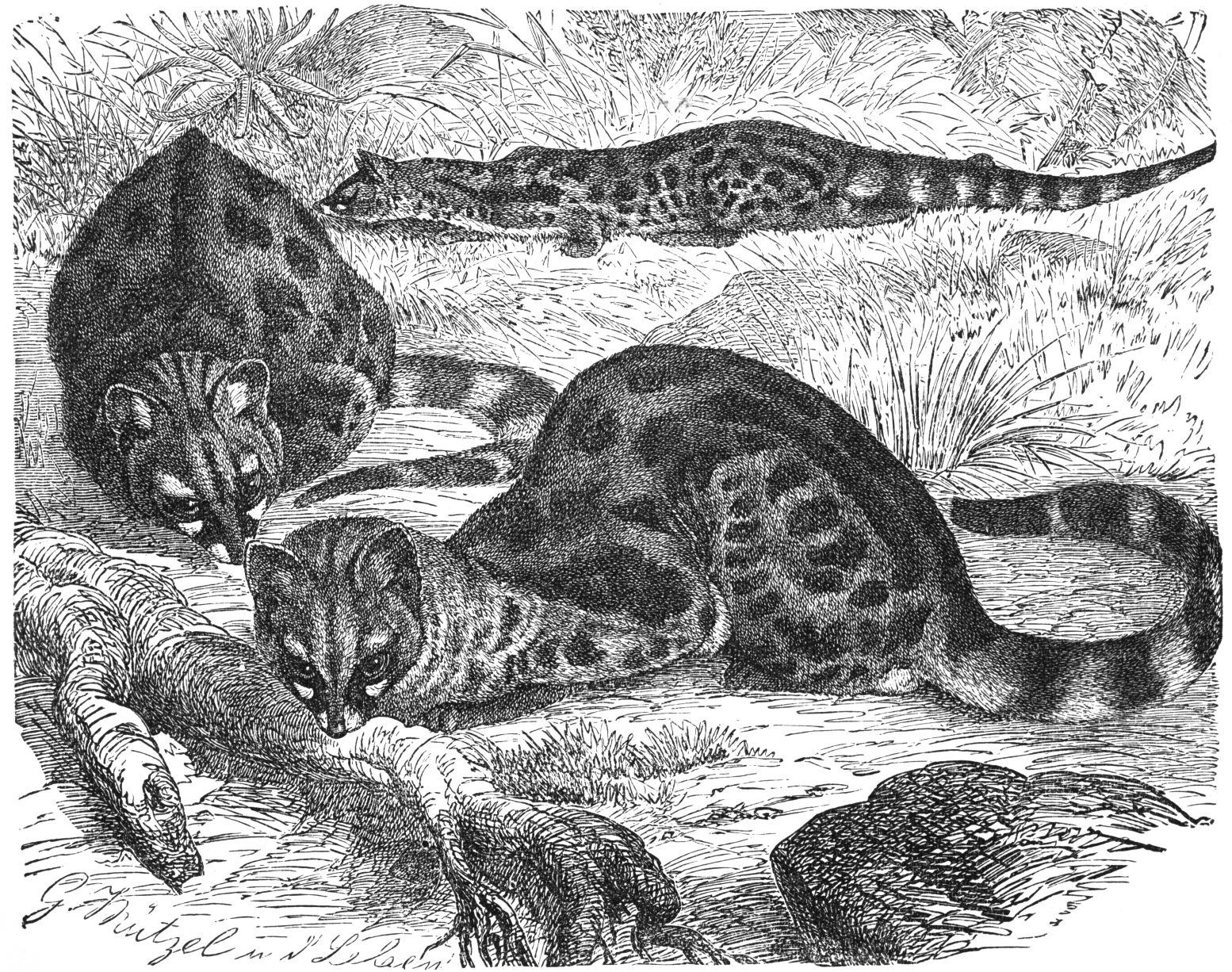
Common genet

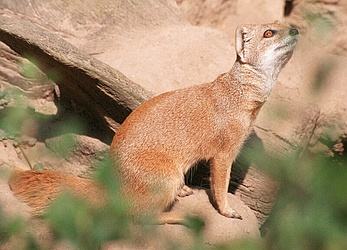
Yellow mongoose

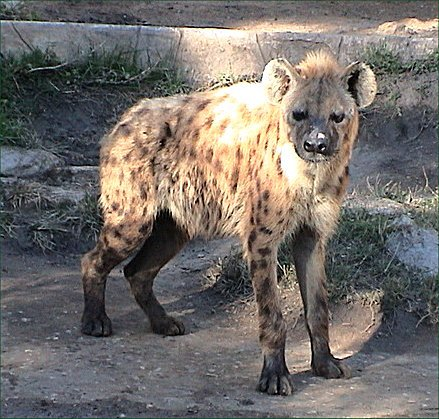
Spotted hyena

There are over 260 species of carnivorans, the majority of which feed primarily on meat. They have a characteristic skull shape and dentition.

- Suborder: Feliformia
  - Family: Felidae (cats)
    - Subfamily: Felinae
      - Genus: Acinonyx
        - Cheetah, Acinonyx jubatus VU
          - Southeast African cheetah, A. j. jubatus
      - Genus: Caracal
        - Caracal, Caracal caracal LC
      - Genus: Felis
        - African wildcat, F. lybica LC
      - Genus: Leptailurus
        - Serval, Leptailurus serval LC
    - Subfamily: Pantherinae
      - Genus: Panthera
        - Lion, Panthera leo VU
          - Panthera leo melanochaita
        - Leopard, Panthera pardus NT
          - African leopard, P. p. pardus
  - Family: Viverridae
    - Subfamily: Viverrinae
      - Genus: Civettictis
        - African civet, C. civetta LC
      - Genus: Genetta
        - Angolan genet, Genetta angolensis LC
        - Common genet, Genetta genetta LC
        - Rusty-spotted genet, Genetta maculata LC
  - Family: Nandiniidae
    - Genus: Nandinia
      - African palm civet, Nandinia binotata LC
  - Family: Herpestidae (mongooses)
    - Genus: Helogale
      - Common dwarf mongoose, Helogale parvula LC
    - Genus: Bdeogale
      - Bushy-tailed mongoose, B. crassicauda LC
    - Genus: Cynictis
      - Yellow mongoose, Cynictis penicillata LC
    - Genus: Herpestes
      - Common slender mongoose, Herpestes sanguineus LC
    - Genus: Ichneumia
      - White-tailed mongoose, I. albicauda LC
    - Genus: Mungos
      - Banded mongoose, Mungos mungo LC
    - Genus: Paracynictis
      - Selous' mongoose, Paracynictis selousi LC
    - Genus: Rhynchogale
      - Meller's mongoose, Rhynchogale melleri LC
  - Family: Hyaenidae (hyaenas)
    - Genus: Crocuta
      - Spotted hyena, Crocuta crocuta LC
    - Genus: Parahyaena
      - Brown hyena, P. brunnea NT
    - Genus: Proteles
      - Aardwolf, Proteles cristatus LC
- Suborder: Caniformia
  - Family: Canidae (dogs, foxes)
    - Genus: Vulpes
      - Cape fox, Vulpes chama LC
    - Genus: Lupulella
      - Side-striped jackal, L. adusta LC
      - Black-backed jackal, L. mesomelas LC
    - Genus: Otocyon
      - Bat-eared fox, Otocyon megalotis LC
    - Genus: Lycaon
      - African wild dog, L. pictus EN
  - Family: Mustelidae (mustelids)
    - Genus: Ictonyx
      - Striped polecat, I. striatus LC
    - Genus: Poecilogale
      - African striped weasel, P. albinucha LC
    - Genus: Mellivora
      - Honey badger, M. capensis LC
    - Genus: Lutra
      - Speckle-throated otter, L. maculicollis LC
    - Genus: Aonyx
      - African clawless otter, A. capensis LC

== Order: Perissodactyla (odd-toed ungulates) ==
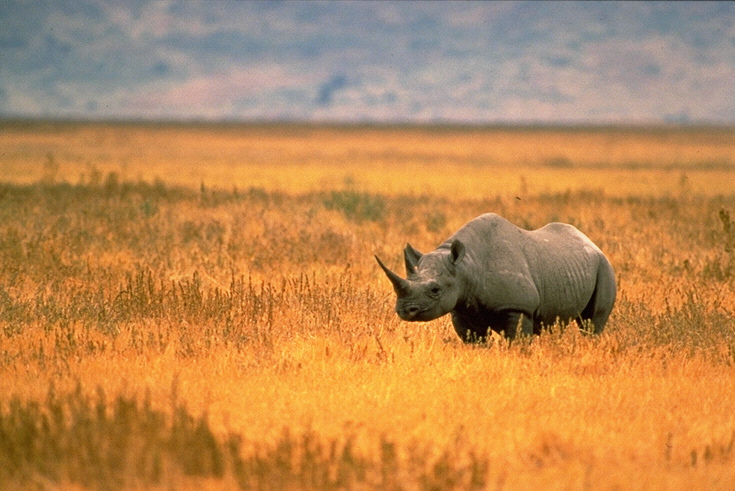
Black rhinoceros

The odd-toed ungulates are browsing and grazing mammals. They are usually large to very large, and have relatively simple stomachs and a large middle toe.

- Family: Equidae (horses etc.)
  - Genus: Equus
    - Plains zebra, E. quagga NT
      - Chapman's zebra, E. q. chapmani
- Family: Rhinocerotidae
  - Genus: Diceros
    - Black rhinoceros, D. bicornis
      - South-central black rhinoceros, D. b. minor CR
  - Genus: Ceratotherium
    - White rhinoceros, C. simum
      - Southern white rhinoceros, C. s. simum NT

== Order: Artiodactyla (even-toed ungulates) ==
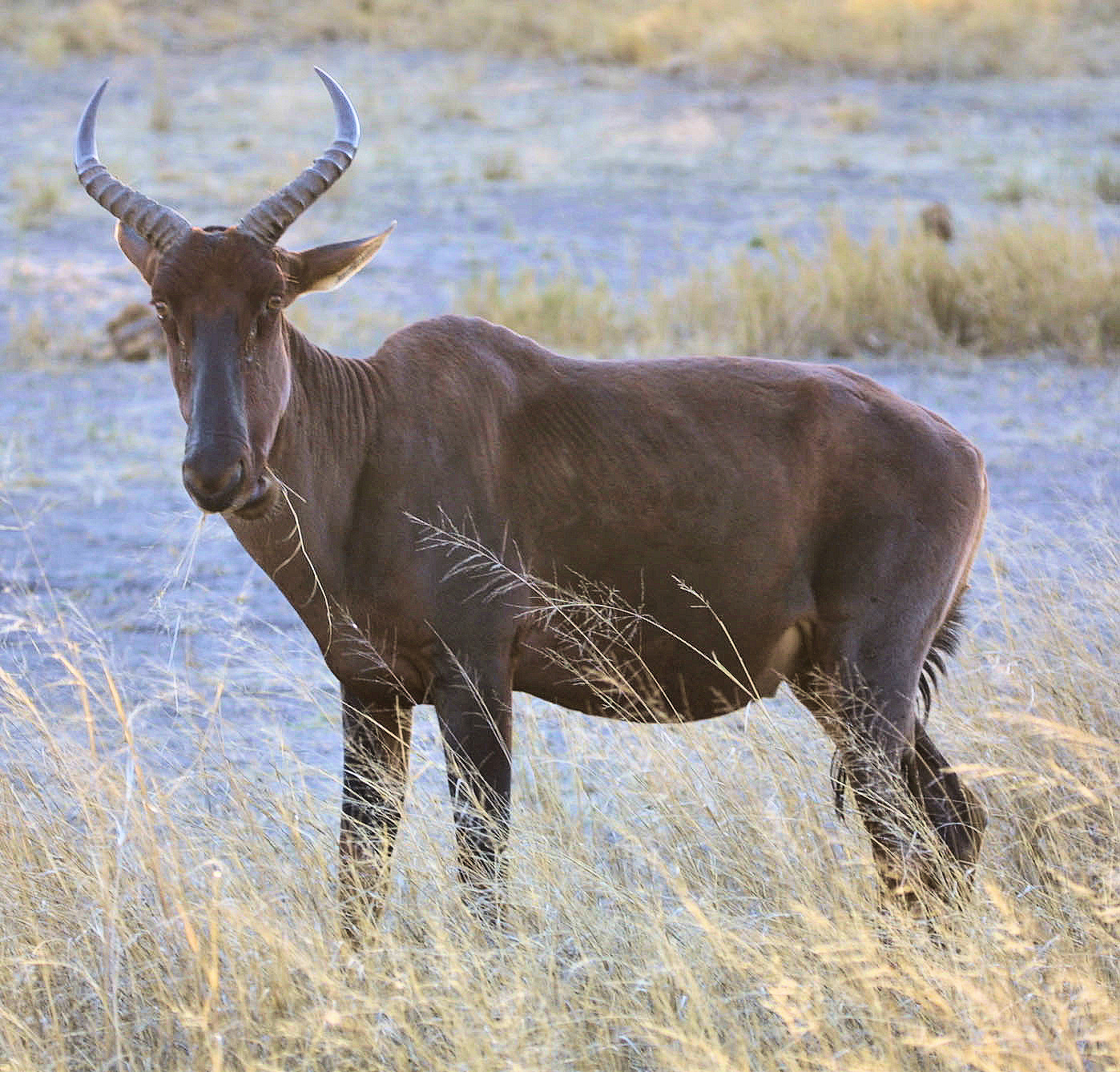
Topi

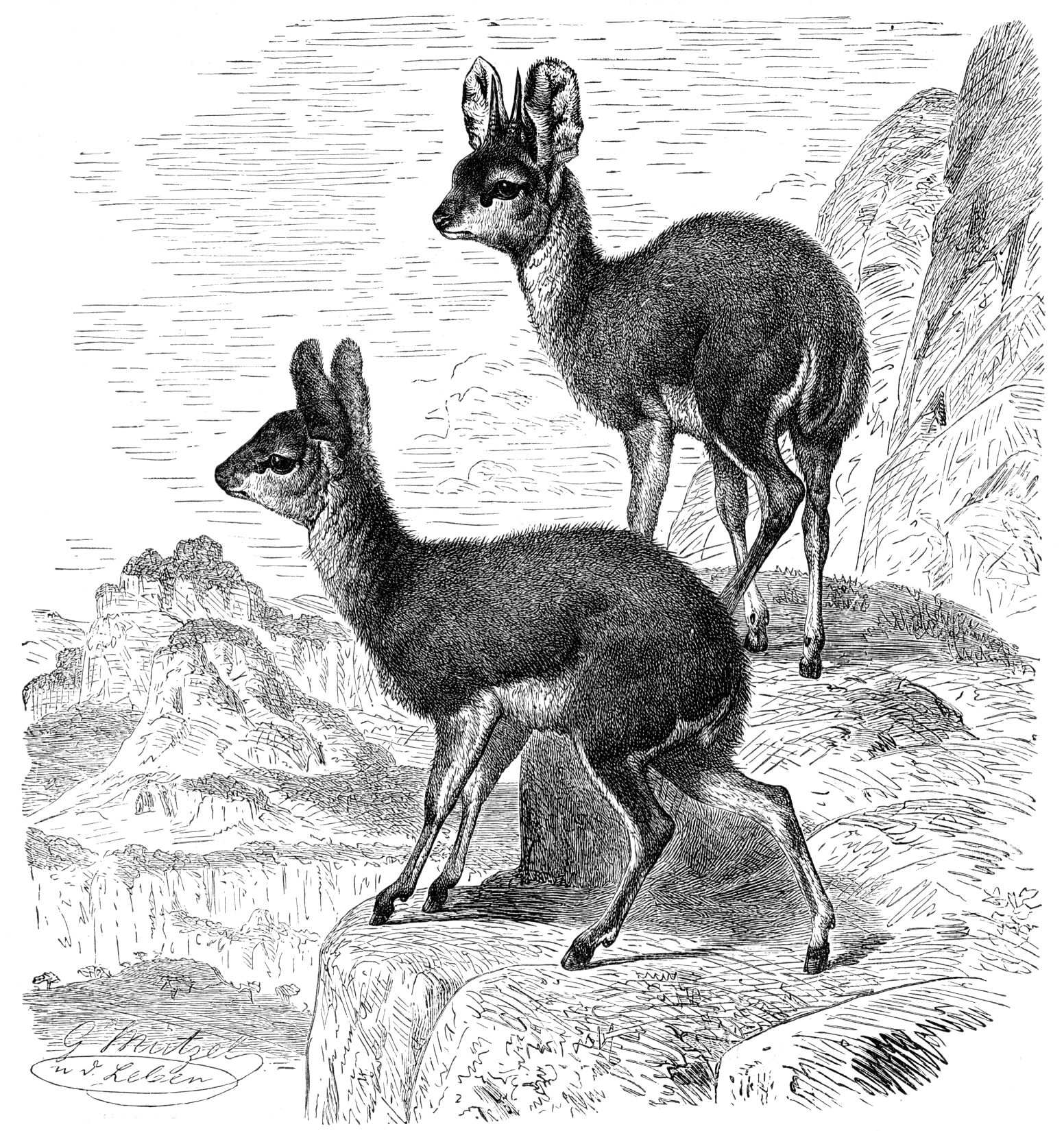
Klipspringer

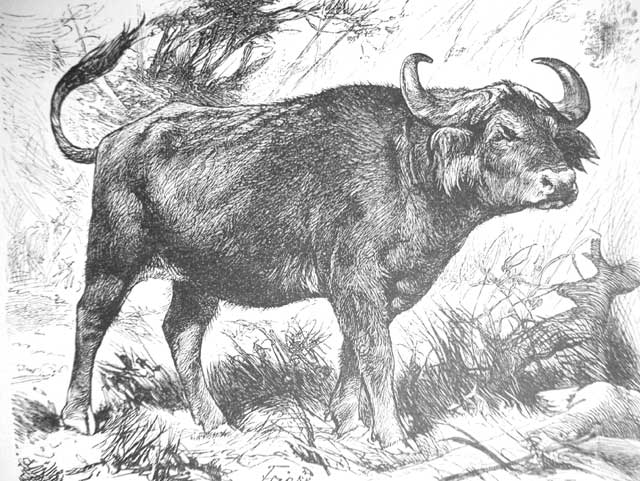
African buffalo

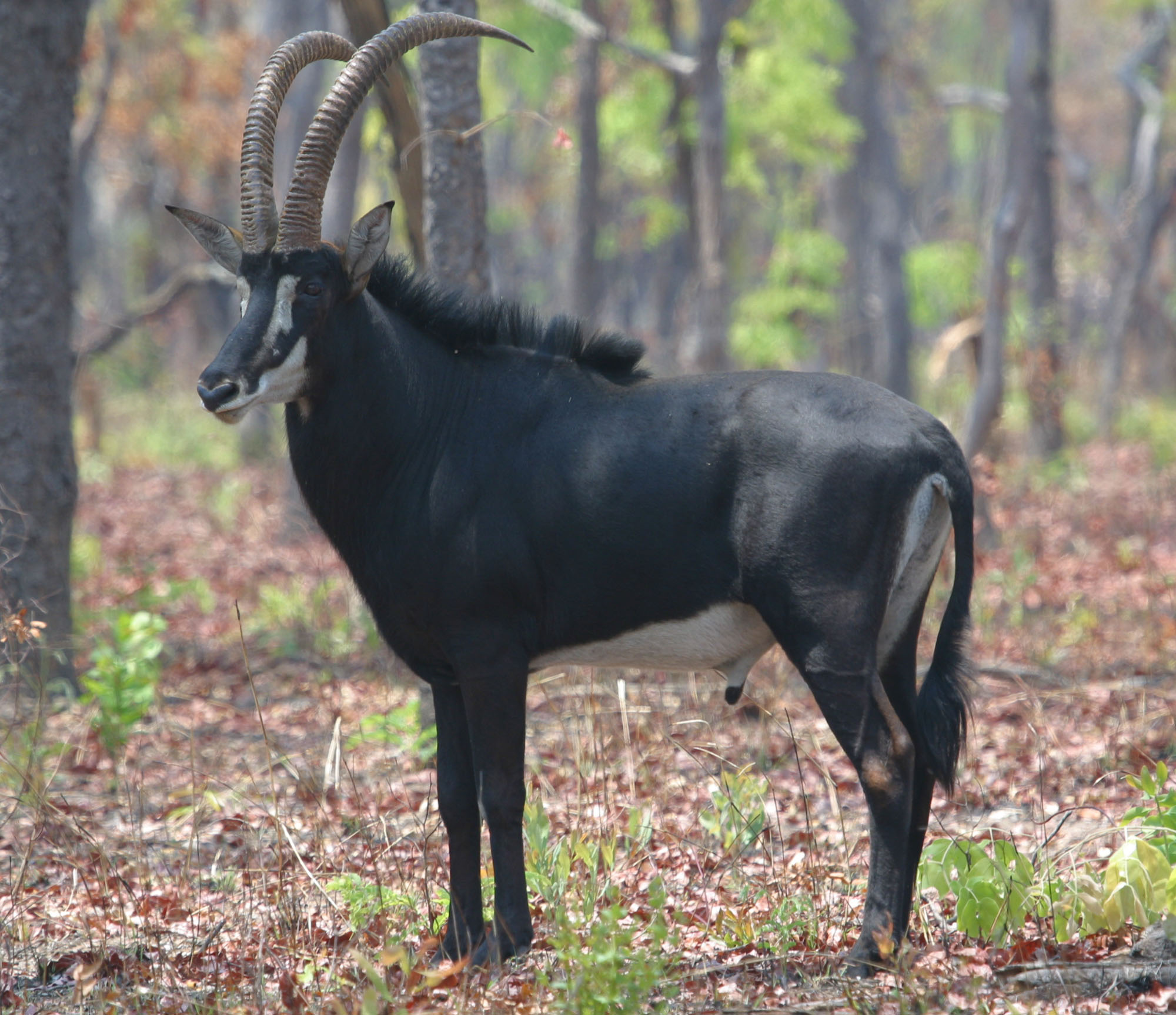
Sable antelope

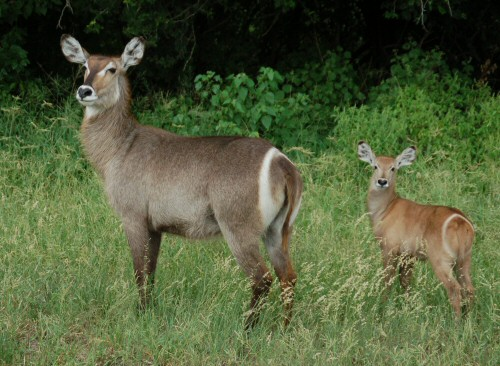
Waterbuck

The even-toed ungulates are ungulates whose weight is borne about equally by the third and fourth toes, rather than mostly or entirely by the third as in perissodactyls. There are about 220 artiodactyl species, including many that are of great economic importance to humans.

- Family: Suidae (pigs)
  - Subfamily: Phacochoerinae
    - Genus: Phacochoerus
      - Common warthog, Phacochoerus africanus LR/lc
  - Subfamily: Suinae
    - Genus: Potamochoerus
      - Bushpig, Potamochoerus larvatus LR/lc
- Family: Hippopotamidae (hippopotamuses)
  - Genus: Hippopotamus
    - Hippopotamus, Hippopotamus amphibius VU
- Family: Giraffidae (giraffe, okapi)
  - Genus: Giraffa
    - South African giraffe, Giraffa giraffa giraffa VU
    - Masai giraffe, Giraffa tippelskirchi VU
- Family: Bovidae (cattle, antelope, sheep, goats)
  - Subfamily: Alcelaphinae
    - Genus: Alcelaphus
      - Hartebeest, Alcelaphus buselaphus LR/cd
    - Genus: Connochaetes
      - Blue wildebeest, Connochaetes taurinus LR/cd
    - Genus: Damaliscus
      - Topi, Damaliscus lunatus LR/cd
  - Subfamily: Antilopinae
    - Genus: Neotragus
      - Suni, Neotragus moschatus LR/cd
    - Genus: Oreotragus
      - Klipspringer, Oreotragus oreotragus LR/cd
    - Genus: Ourebia
      - Oribi, Ourebia ourebi LR/cd
    - Genus: Raphicerus
      - Steenbok, Raphicerus campestris LR/lc
      - Sharpe's grysbok, Raphicerus sharpei LR/cd
  - Subfamily: Bovinae
    - Genus: Syncerus
      - African buffalo, S. caffer NT
    - Genus: Tragelaphus
      - Nyala, Tragelaphus angasii LR/cd
      - Common eland, Tragelaphus oryx LR/cd
      - Bushbuck, Tragelaphus scriptus LR/lc
      - Sitatunga, Tragelaphus spekii LR/nt
      - Greater kudu, Tragelaphus strepsiceros LR/cd
  - Subfamily: Cephalophinae
    - Genus: Cephalophus
      - Blue duiker, Cephalophus monticola LR/lc
    - Genus: Sylvicapra
      - Common duiker, Sylvicapra grimmia LR/lc
  - Subfamily: Hippotraginae
    - Genus: Hippotragus
      - Roan antelope, Hippotragus equinus LR/cd
      - Sable antelope, Hippotragus niger LR/cd
    - Genus: Oryx
      - Gemsbok, Oryx gazella LR/cd
  - Subfamily: Aepycerotinae
    - Genus: Aepyceros
      - Impala, Aepyceros melampus LR/cd
  - Subfamily: Reduncinae
    - Genus: Kobus
      - Waterbuck, Kobus ellipsiprymnus LR/cd
      - Puku, Kobus vardonii LR/cd
    - Genus: Redunca
      - Southern reedbuck, Redunca arundinum LR/cd

== See also ==
- List of chordate orders
- Lists of mammals by region
- List of mammals described in the 2000s
