= Tadarida constantinei =

Constantine's free-tailed bat Temporal range: Pleistocene

Scientific classification
- Domain: Eukaryota
- Kingdom: Animalia
- Phylum: Chordata
- Class: Mammalia
- Order: Chiroptera
- Family: Molossidae
- Genus: Tadarida
- Species: †T. constantinei

Binomial name
- †Tadarida constantinei Lawrence, 1960

Extinct species of bat

Tadarida constantinei, Constantine's free-tailed bat, is a prehistoric bat species whose remains have been found in Carlsbad Caverns National Park, New Mexico.

== Description ==
Constantine's free-tailed bat is characterized by its relatively great size and long, rather evenly rectangular skull. Total average length measurements from the occipital condyle to the anterior of the alveolus based on 19 specimens is from 16.5 to 17.4 mm.

Bones of this species found in Slaughter Canyon Cave have been dated to a minimum of 209 ± 9 ka.
