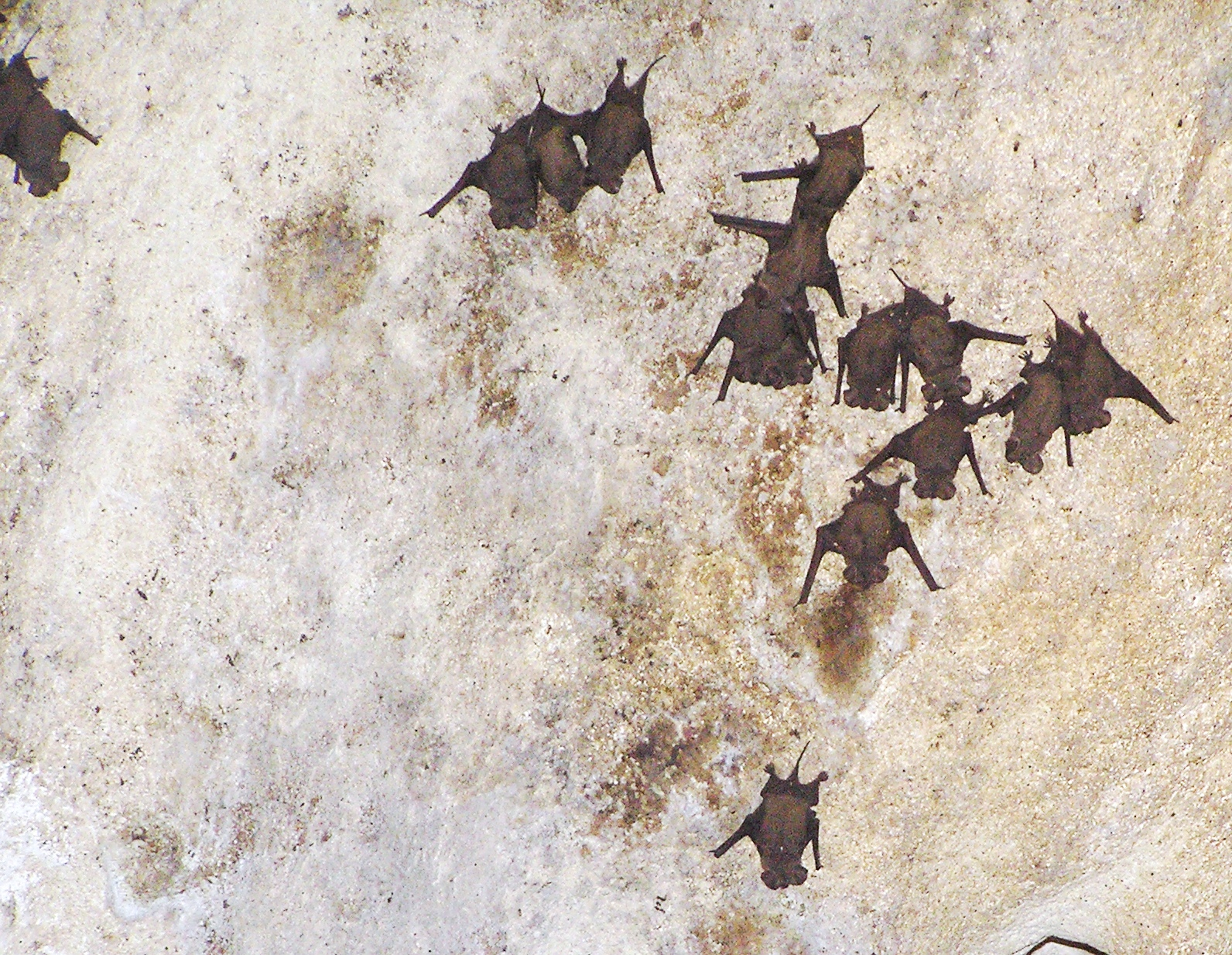
- Mexican free-tailed bat (Tadarida brasiliensis)

Scientific classification
- Kingdom: Animalia
- Phylum: Chordata
- Class: Mammalia
- Order: Chiroptera
- Family: Molossidae
- Genus: Tadarida; Rafinesque, 1814

Type species
- Cephalotes teniotis Rafinesque, 1814

Species
- See text

= Tadarida =

Genus of bats

The genus Tadarida has nine or more species of free-tailed bats divided into two subgenera, with the first of these containing seven species spread across the Old World (including southern Europe and North Africa, large parts of southern Asia, and India right across to Japan). Four species occur exclusively in Africa including Madagascar while two more species occur in central Papua New Guinea, and western and southern Australia, respectively.

The relatively well-known species T. teniotis, which occurs in southern Europe and North Africa, the Middle East, and across southern Asia to Japan, is known to fly often during the late afternoon, where it hawks for insects alongside swifts (Apodidae), swallows, and martins (Hirundinidae).

The other subgenus contains the widespread New World single species T. brasiliensis (subgenus Rhizomops), which ranges from the southern United States and the West Indies to Chile and Argentina. This species is noted for its massive maternity colonies in the United States, especially in the southwest, where an estimated population of over 25 million (possibly as high as 50 million) existed in Eagle Creek Cave in Arizona in the 1960s.

== Taxonomy ==
Molecular sequence data indicate Tadarida is not a monophyletic taxon. The closest relative of Tadarida aegyptiaca of Africa and southwest Asia is Chaerephon jobimena of Madagascar. These two species plus T. brasiliensis of the Americas form a clade believed to be about 9.8 million years old.

The genus name Tadarida is attributed to the naturalist Constantine Samuel Rafinesque, who gave no clues to its etymology. It has been suggested that the name comes from the Corsican word for bat, taddarita. but no such word exists in the Corsican language (where bat is called topu pinnutu). Indeed, Rafinesque, being in Palermo, Sicily, during its studies, probably took this name from Sicilian, where the bat is called taḍḍarita, from Greek λαχταρίδα (lachtarida)

Species list for genus:

- Tadarida aegyptiaca - Egyptian free-tailed bat
- Tadarida brasiliensis (now in subgenus Rhizomops) - Mexican free-tailed bat or Brazilian free-tailed bat
- †Tadarida constantinei - Constantine's free-tailed bat
- Tadarida fulminans - Madagascan large free-tailed bat
- Tadarida insignis - East Asian free-tailed bat
- Tadarida latouchei - La Touche's free-tailed bat
- Tadarida lobata - Kenyan big-eared free-tailed bat
- Tadarida teniotis European free-tailed bat
- Tadarida ventralis - African giant free-tailed bat
