= Bracken Cave =

Cave in Comal County, Texas, US

Coordinates: 29.68715°N 98.352606°W

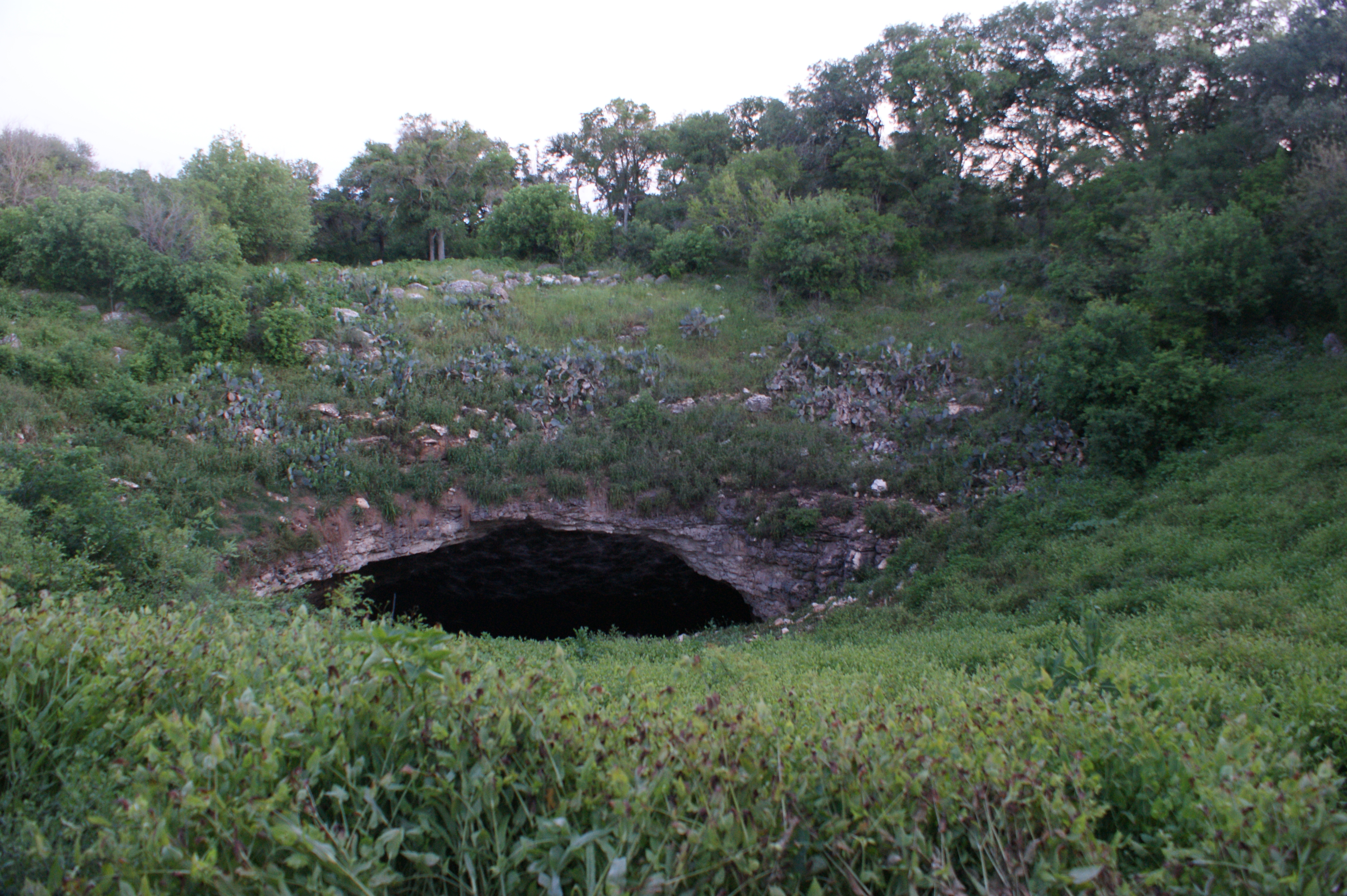
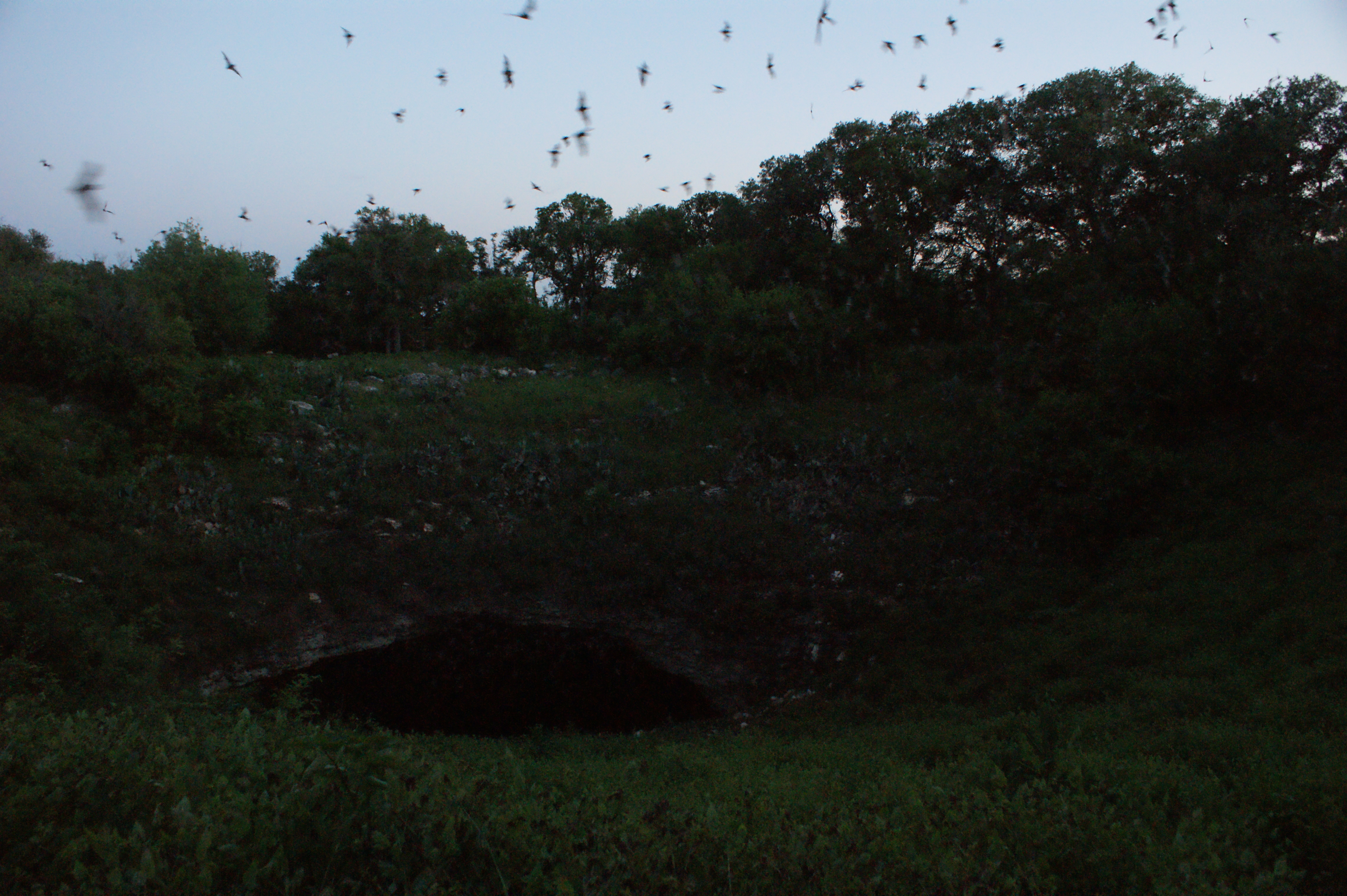
Bracken Bat Cave by day and night

Bats emerging from Bracken Cave on the evening of 17 June 2017

Bracken Cave is a cave located in southern Comal County, Texas, outside the city of San Antonio. The 100-foot (30 m)-wide crescent shaped opening to the cave lies at the bottom of a sinkhole, formed when the roof of the cave collapsed. It is the summer home to the largest colony of bats in the world. An estimated 20 million Mexican free-tailed bats roost in the cave from March to October, making it the largest known concentration of mammals in the world.

The cave and undeveloped 1,521 acres (616 ha) around it are owned by Austin, Texas-based Bat Conservation International, which restores the land to support native vegetation and an abundant variety of wildlife.Bat Conservation International bought the initial 697 acres (282 ha) from the Marbach family in 1992, and has been assisted in preservation efforts by The Nature Conservancy. Access to the cave is restricted to protect the habitat of the resident bats. Bat Conservation International offers evening guided tours to the cave to watch the bats emerge from the cave.

== Description ==
The Bracken Cave is the destination every March or April of over 20,000,000 Mexican free-tailed bats (Tadarida brasiliensis). These bats fly as much as 1,000 miles (1,600 km) from Mexico to this cave. After arriving in the cave, the migrant mothers give birth to pups. An astounding 500 pups have been recorded clinging to 1-square-foot (0.093 m^{2}) of the cave walls—an ingenious way for keeping warm; the temperature is around 102 °F (39 °C). The city of San Antonio, a local developer, and conservation groups reached agreement on "a $20 million deal" in 2014, to ensure that human development would not encroach on the bats, and that the sky near their cave would remain dark at night.

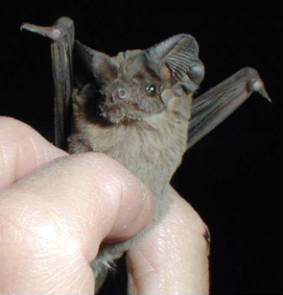
A Mexican free-tailed bat (Tadarida brasiliensis)

== Farming benefits ==
According to Mike Pacheco, U.S. Department of Agriculture wildlife biologist for Randolph Air Force Base, "From March to October, the bats at Bracken Cave emerge between 6 and 8 p.m. flying southeast on a collision course with bugs such as cotton bollworth moths and army cut-worm moths being pushed away from crops southwest by winds."

The bats consume several tons of insects per night, which according to research conducted in 2006, saves cotton farmers in south central Texas approximately $1.2 million a year.

== Unknown bat count ==
While the Bracken Cave bat roost is often estimated at 20 million, the true number of bats is unknown due to unreliable counting methods. An animal behavior expert named Leonard Ireland, who researched the bats at Bracken Cave in the 1960s and 1970s, once said the clouds of bats emerging from the cave were up to "30 miles (48 km) long and 20 miles (32 km) wide."

== In media ==
Bracken Cave has been featured in the media several times since its discovery. The National Geographic Wild channel included Bracken Cave in the World's Weirdest series episode "Freaks of the Sky." It was also featured in the first pilot episode of Dirty Jobs.

== See also ==
- Ann W. Richards Congress Avenue Bridge#Bats
