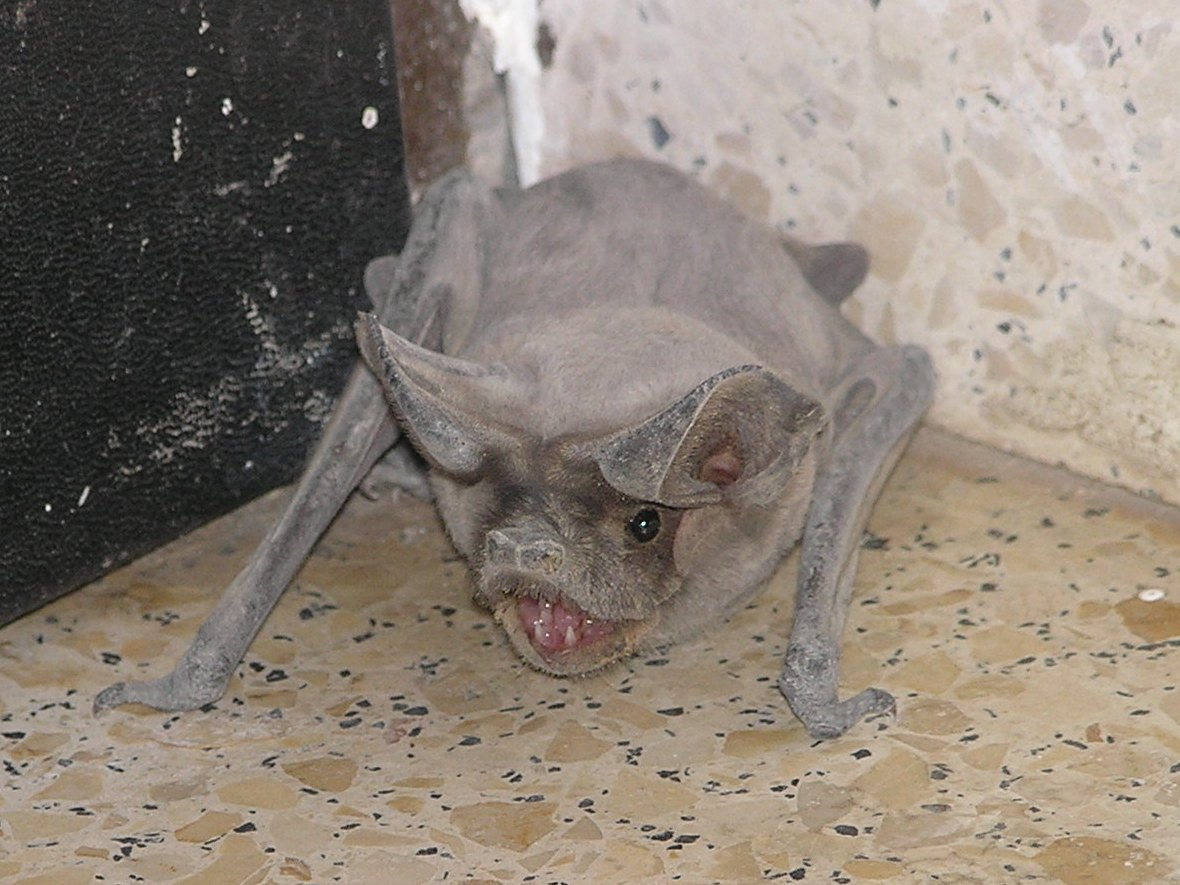

Conservation status
- Least Concern (IUCN 3.1)

Scientific classification
- Kingdom: Animalia
- Phylum: Chordata
- Class: Mammalia
- Order: Chiroptera
- Family: Molossidae
- Genus: Tadarida
- Species: T. teniotis

Binomial name
- Tadarida teniotis (Rafinesque, 1814)
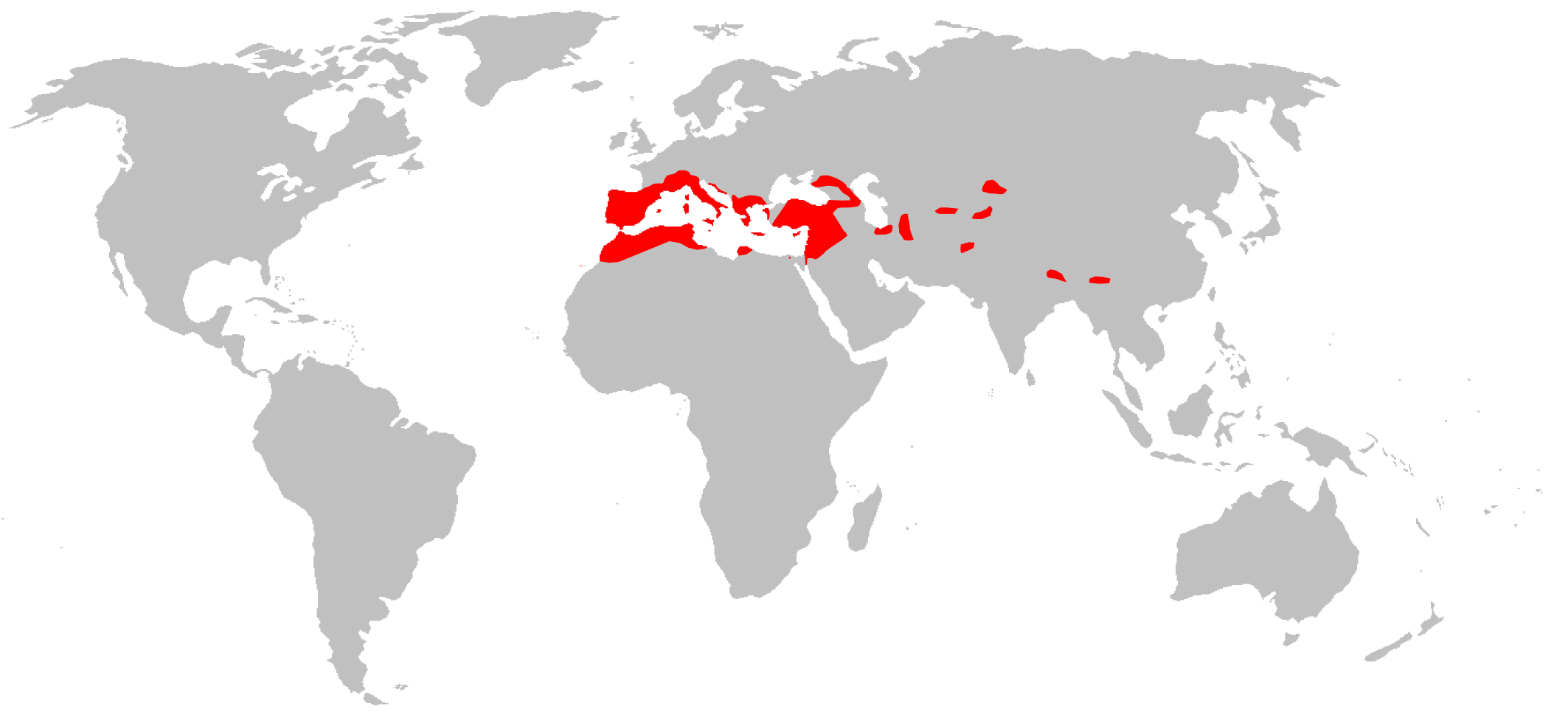

= European free-tailed bat =

Species of bat

The European free-tailed bat (Tadarida teniotis, sometimes given as Tadarida insignis) is a species of free-tailed bat found in the Old World. Other common names include the bulldog bat and the mastiff bat because of the presence of wrinkling on the snout. This bat is found in the Mediterranean region of Europe and in scattered locations across Asia at altitudes from sea level to 3100 m. The range of distribution is from the Canary Islands and Madeira through the whole Mediterranean area, Asia Minor, the Caucasus and the Middle East. In the north to southern France, southern Germany, Switzerland, Croatia and Bulgaria. It was reported from Korea in 1931, but has not been sighted on the Korean Peninsula since then. Populations in Japan, Taiwan and Korea are now considered to be a separate species Tadarida insignis.

== Description ==
The European free-tailed bat has large, broad ears, each with a very small tragus, a backward-pointing projection which helps direct sound into the ear. Its muzzle has wrinkled lips, which gives its face a similarity to a dog's face and is the origin for its common names of bulldog or mastiff bat. Its tail is fleshy and robust, and the rear third is not connected to any membranes. Its fur is short and even, the dorsal (upper) surface is greyish-black, with a brownish shine, while the ventral (under) surface is paler. Its ears, wing and tail membranes are black and it has an unpleasant smell. This bat's head and body length is about 3.5 inches (89 mm), its tail about 2 inches (51 mm) and its weight from 1 to 2 ounces (28 to 57 g).

== Behaviour ==
The European free-tailed bat roosts by day in crevices in cliffs, in rocky gorges, under overhangs, in holes in tall buildings, under roof tiles or under stone bridges. It emerges at dusk and flies at a great height with a swift direct flight, not exhibiting the sudden twists and turns shown by many other bat species. It feeds on insects caught in flight and seldom needs to drink. When it does drink, it scoops up water from a pond or river while flying low over the surface. Before leaving the roost it makes a rattling sound and it often emits a characteristic "tsick-tsick" in flight, enabling it to be recognised by sound.

European free-tailed bats generally live solitary lives but small groups of females come together to breed. The gestation period is about eighty days and a single youngster is born in some dark, concealed location. The juvenile opens its eyes when about a week old, can fly by four weeks and is independent by seven weeks. It matures at a year old and the lifespan is about ten years.

== Status ==
The European free-tailed bat is included by the IUCN in its Red List of Threatened Species as being of "Least Concern". The threats it faces include the use of pesticides, deforestation, the loss of roosts in some buildings and possible injury from wind turbines, however it is felt that none of these is a particularly serious threat. The population trend is not known but it is a common species in suitable habitats and bats in general receive protection in a number of European Union member states.
