= Mops jobimena =

Black and red free-tailed bat

Conservation status
- Least Concern (IUCN 3.1)

Scientific classification
- Kingdom: Animalia
- Phylum: Chordata
- Class: Mammalia
- Order: Chiroptera
- Family: Molossidae
- Genus: Mops
- Species: M. jobimena

Binomial name
- Mops jobimena Goodman & Cardiff, 2004
- Range

Synonyms
- Tadarida jobimena (Goodman & Cardiff, 2004)

Species of bat

Mops jobimena, commonly known as the black and red free-tailed bat, is a species of bat in the family Molossidae. It is endemic to western Madagascar. With a forearm length of 45 to 48 mm (1.8 to 1.9 in),

== Habitat ==
The known habitats of the species are tropical dry deciduous forest and spiny forest at altitudes from 50 to 870 m. It roosts in trees as well as in houses and other buildings, but has not been found to commonly roost in caves.

== Taxonomy ==
Although currently listed as a member of the genus Mops, whose members it resembles morphologically, M. jobimena's closest relatives based on molecular evidence are Tadarida aegyptiaca of Africa and southwest Asia, and Tadarida brasiliensis of the Americas, which form a clade believed to be about 9.8 million years old. M. jobimena and T. aegyptiaca were found to be sister species. The morphological resemblance thus apparently represents parallel or convergent evolution.

== Conservation status ==
Although the species is not common, it has an extensive range that includes the vicinity of four protected areas, and is not believed to be dependent on undisturbed forest habitat. For these reasons, it has been categorized as being of 'least concern' by the IUCN. Subsistence hunting may be a threat in southern Madagascar.

== See also ==
- List of bats of Madagascar
