= East Asian free-tailed bat =

Conservation status
- Data Deficient (IUCN 3.1)

Scientific classification
- Kingdom: Animalia
- Phylum: Chordata
- Class: Mammalia
- Order: Chiroptera
- Family: Molossidae
- Genus: Tadarida
- Species: T. insignis

Binomial name
- Tadarida insignis (Blyth, 1862)

Synonyms
- Nyctinomus insignis Blyth, 1862; Nyctinomus teniotis insignis (Blyth, 1862); Tadarida teniotis insignis (Blyth, 1862); Nyctinomus cestonii (Savi), 1825

Species of mammal

The East Asian free-tailed bat (Tadarida insignis) was formerly considered to belong to the same species as the European free-tailed bat. Its range includes China, Japan, and the Korean Peninsula.

== Taxonomy ==
It was described as a new species in 1862 by English zoologist Edward Blyth. The holotype had been collected by Robert Swinhoe. Blyth placed it in the now-defunct genus Nyctinomus with a binomial of N. insignis. In 1873, George Edward Dobson considered it a synonym of Nyctinomus cestonii, which itself was deemed a synonym of the European free-tailed bat (N. teniotis, now Tadarida teniotis) by Oldfield Thomas.

== Description ==
It has a forearm length of 57–65 mm (2.2–2.6 in). It has long, narrow wings.

== Range and status ==
It is known to roost in caves and inhabits China, North and South Korea, Taiwan, and Japan. As of 2019, it is evaluated as a data deficient species by the IUCN. It meets the criteria for this classification because it is a poorly-studied species; little is known about its biology, ecology, population size and trend, nor threats that it is facing. It is presumably threatened by the destruction of its roosts. Cave roosting habitat is lost due to cave tourism and stone quarrying.
