= Madagascan large free-tailed bat =

Conservation status
- Least Concern (IUCN 3.1)

Scientific classification
- Kingdom: Animalia
- Phylum: Chordata
- Class: Mammalia
- Order: Chiroptera
- Family: Molossidae
- Genus: Tadarida
- Species: T. fulminans

Binomial name
- Tadarida fulminans Thomas, 1903

Species of bat

The Madagascan large free-tailed bat (Tadarida fulminans) is a species of bat in the family Molossidae. It is found in Democratic Republic of the Congo, Kenya, Madagascar, Malawi, Rwanda, South Africa, Tanzania, Zambia, and Zimbabwe. Its natural habitat is savanna.
