= List of forests in India =

The following table is a non-exhaustive list of forests found in India.

Name	Image	Location	Area	Comments
Abujmarh forest		Chhattisgarh	4000 km^{2}	Home to Gond, Muria and Halba tribes; infamous for Naxal-Maoist insurgency
Annekal Reserved Forest		Western Ghats		
Baikunthapur Forest		Dooars, West Bengal		This is a terai forest
Bandipur National Park		Karnataka	874 km^{2}	
Bhadra Wildlife Sanctuary		Shivamogga, Karnataka	892 km^{2}	One of India's premier tiger reserves
Bhagwan Mahaveer Sanctuary and Mollem National Park		Sanguem taluk, Goa	650 km^{2}	
Bhitarkanika Mangroves		Odisha	650 km^{2}	
Bondla Wildlife Sanctuary		Ponda taluk, Goa	8 km^{2}	Provides sanctuary to leopards who have been injured in human-wildlife conflict.
Chambal National Sanctuary		On the Chambal River, near the tripoint of Rajasthan, Madhya Pradesh and Uttar Pradesh	5400 km^{2}	Part of the Khathiar–Gir dry deciduous forests region
Cotigao Wildlife Sanctuary		Canacona taluk, Goa	85.65 km^{2}	It is known for its dense forest of tall trees, some of which reach 30 metres in height.
Gir National Park		Talala taluk, Gir Somnath district, Gujarat	1412 km^{2}	
Jakanari reserve forest		Coimbatore		
Jim Corbett National Park		Nainital district and Pauri Garhwal district, Uttarakhand	520.8 km^{2}	
Kanha National Park		Madhya Pradesh	650 km^{2}	The present-day Kanha area is divided into two sanctuaries, Hallon and Banjar, of 250 and 300 km^{2} respectively.
Keibul Lamjao National Park		Bishnupur district, Manipur	40 km^{2}	The national park is characterized by many floating decomposed plant materials locally called phumdis.
Kukrail Reserve Forest		Lucknow, Uttar Pradesh	20 km^{2}	An urban forest in the city of Lucknow, slow development is happening around this forest but the main forest is preserved by the government; a night safari and a modern zoo have also been proposed here by the government.
Mhadei Wildlife Sanctuary		Sattari taluk, Goa	208.5 km^{2}	Bengal tigers can be found here.
Molai forest		Majuli island on the Brahmaputra River	5.5 km^{2}	
Nagarhole National Park		Kodagu district and Mysore district, Karnataka	642 km^{2}	One of India's premier tiger reserves
Nallamala Hills		Eastern Ghats, Andhra Pradesh (South of River Krishna)		
Namdapha National Park		Arunachal Pradesh	1985 km^{2}	Fourth largest national park in India.
Nanmangalam forest		Chennai, Tamil Nadu	24 km^{2}	The reserve forest area is 3.2 km^{2}
Netravali Wildlife Sanctuary		Goa	211 km^{2}	
New Amarambalam Reserved Forest		Nilambur, Malappuram district, Kerala	265.72 km^{2}	
Pichavaram Mangrove Forest		Pichavaram, Cuddalore district, Tamil Nadu	11 km^{2}	World's second biggest mangrove forest
Salim Ali Bird Sanctuary		Chorão (island) on Mandovi river, Goa	1.8 km^{2}	Mangrove habitat
Saranda forest		West Singhbhum district, Jharkhand	820 km^{2}	
Shettihalli		Karnataka (Tunga River)	395.6 km^{2}	
Sundarbans		West Bengal	3260 km^{2}	Dense mangrove forest, one of the largest reserves for the Bengal Tiger and a UNESCO World Heritage Site
Tadoba Andhari Tiger Reserve		Chandrapur district, Maharashtra		
Valmiki National Park		West Champaran district, Bihar	898.45 km^{2}	The only national park in Bihar
Vandalur Reserve Forest		Vandalur, Tamil Nadu		
Wayanad Wildlife Sanctuary		Wayanad, Kerala	344 km^{2}	

== See also ==
- Lists of forests
- Communal forests of India
- Protected areas of India
- Reserved forests and protected forests of India
- Tropical rainforests of India
- List of countries by forest area
- Sacred groves of India
- Forests in Odisha
- Mangroves in India
