= Bhimgad Fort =

Historical ruins

Coordinates: 15°31′30″N 74°16′57″E

- Type: Historical ruins
- Location: Bhimgad Wildlife Sanctuary, Khanapur Taluk, Belgaum District, Karnataka, India
- Elevation: 550 metres (1,800 ft)
- Height: 91 metres (299 ft)
- Built: Mid 17th century
- Built by: Shivaji

Bhimgad Fort are historical ruins located within the Bhimgad Wildlife Sanctuary, on a detached spur of the Western Ghats, in Khanapur Taluk of Belgaum District near Jamboti Village, Karnataka state, India. It is located in the heart of the Mhadei river watershed. It was built and occupied by ch.Shivaji maharaj in the mid 17th century during his conquest of South India to defend from the Portuguese colonial troops who controlled Goa at that time.

== Location ==
The fort sits on top of a 300 ft (91 m) rock outcropping at the crest of the escarpment overlooking the Mhadei Wildlife Sanctuary and rising 1,800 ft (550 m) near vertically above the plains to the west. The defenses were almost entirely natural, requiring little additional construction.

== History ==
Near the end of 1676, Chattrapati Shivaji besieged Belgaum and Vayem Rayim in current day northern Karnataka. From here he launched a wave of conquests in southern India with a massive force of 30,000 cavalry and 20,000 infantry. Bhimgad was one of the forts that Chattrapati Shivaji still held when he died in 1680.

In 1719, the fort was included with the 16 districts given to a grandson of Shivaji, Chattrapati Shahu, at the beginning of his own rule. About 1787, the fort was overtaken by the Nesagari chief but it was soon retaken. In 1820 it was observed by the British and in 1844 it was occupied by them to guard against insurgents who threatened Belgaum.

== Description ==
There is one narrow stone-cut trail leading up to the fort. The ruins are 1,380 ft (420 m) long from north to south and 825 ft (251 m) broad from east to west. The fort has only one gateway and the walls are still mostly intact. The inside is overgrown with brush and there is one fresh-water spring on the west side and a small reservoir in the north, both of which are dry in the two hottest months of the year. The fort had an eight-pound gun and a three-pound gun plus a wall musket. Bhimgad was one of the forts that Shivaji still held when he died in 1680.
