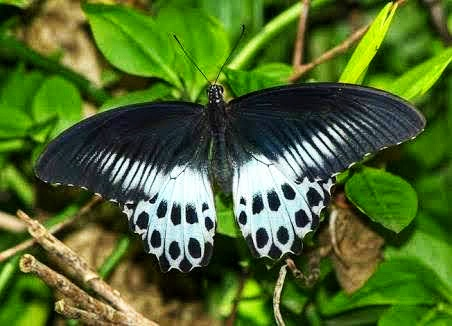
- Indian blue mormon at Sanjay Gandhi National Park, India

Scientific classification
- Kingdom: Animalia
- Phylum: Arthropoda
- Clade: Pancrustacea
- Class: Insecta
- Order: Lepidoptera
- Family: Papilionidae
- Genus: Papilio
- Species: P. agenor
- Subspecies: P. a. polymnestor

Trinomial name
- Papilio agenor polymnestor Cramer, 1775

= Papilio agenor polymnestor =

Indian blue mormon

Species of butterfly

Papilio agenor polymnestor, the Indian blue mormon, is a large swallowtail butterfly found in south, central, eastern and north-eastern India. It is the "state butterfly" of the Indian state of Maharashtra. With a wingspan of 120–150 mm, it is the fourth largest butterfly of India.

== Description ==
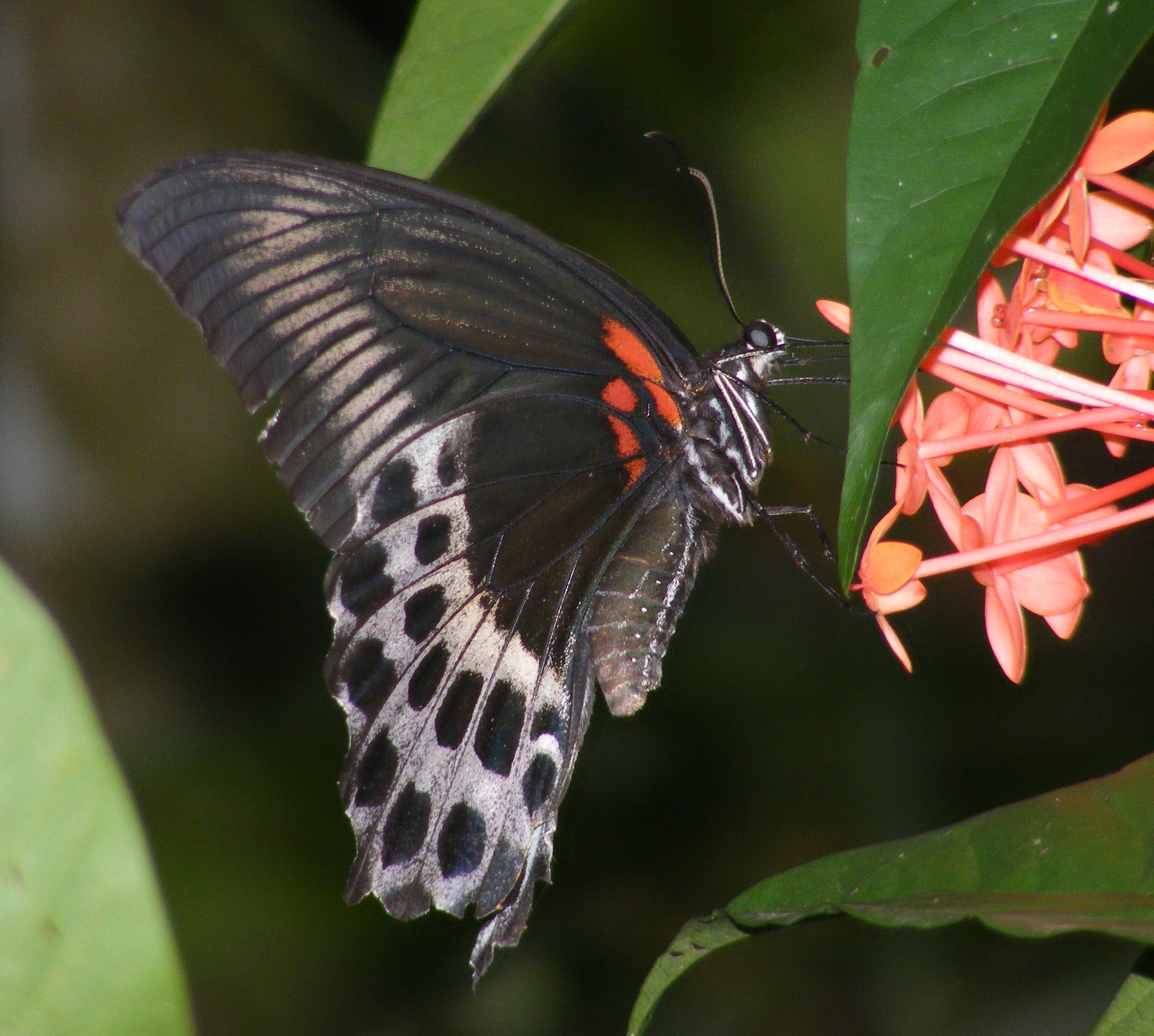
Underside of blue Mormon

Males have the upper wings rich velvety black. The forewing has a postdiscal band composed of internervular broad blue streaks gradually shortened and obsolescent anteriorly, not extended beyond interspace 6.

The hindwing has the terminal three-fourths beyond a line crossing the apical third of the cell pale blue, or greyish blue, with superposed postdiscal, subterminal and terminal series of black spots—the postdiscal spots elongate, inwardly conical; the subterminal oval, placed in the interspaces, the terminal irregular, placed along the apices of the veins and anteriorly coalescing more or less with the subterminal spots.

The underside is black with and on the base of the cell in the forewing is an elongate spot of dark red; the postdiscal transverse series of streaks as on the upperside but grey tinged with ochraceous and extended right up to the costa; in some specimens similar but narrow streaks also in the cell. Hindwing with five irregular small patches of red at base, the outer three-fourths of the wing grey touched with ochraceous, but generally narrower than the blue on the upperside; the inner margin of the grey area crosses the wing beyond the cell; the postdiscal and subterminal black spots as on the upperside. In some specimens this grey area is greatly restricted, its inner margin crossing the wing well beyond the apex of the cell; the subterminal spots merged completely with the terminal spots and form a comparatively broad terminal black band. Antennae, head, thorax and abdomen blackish brown.

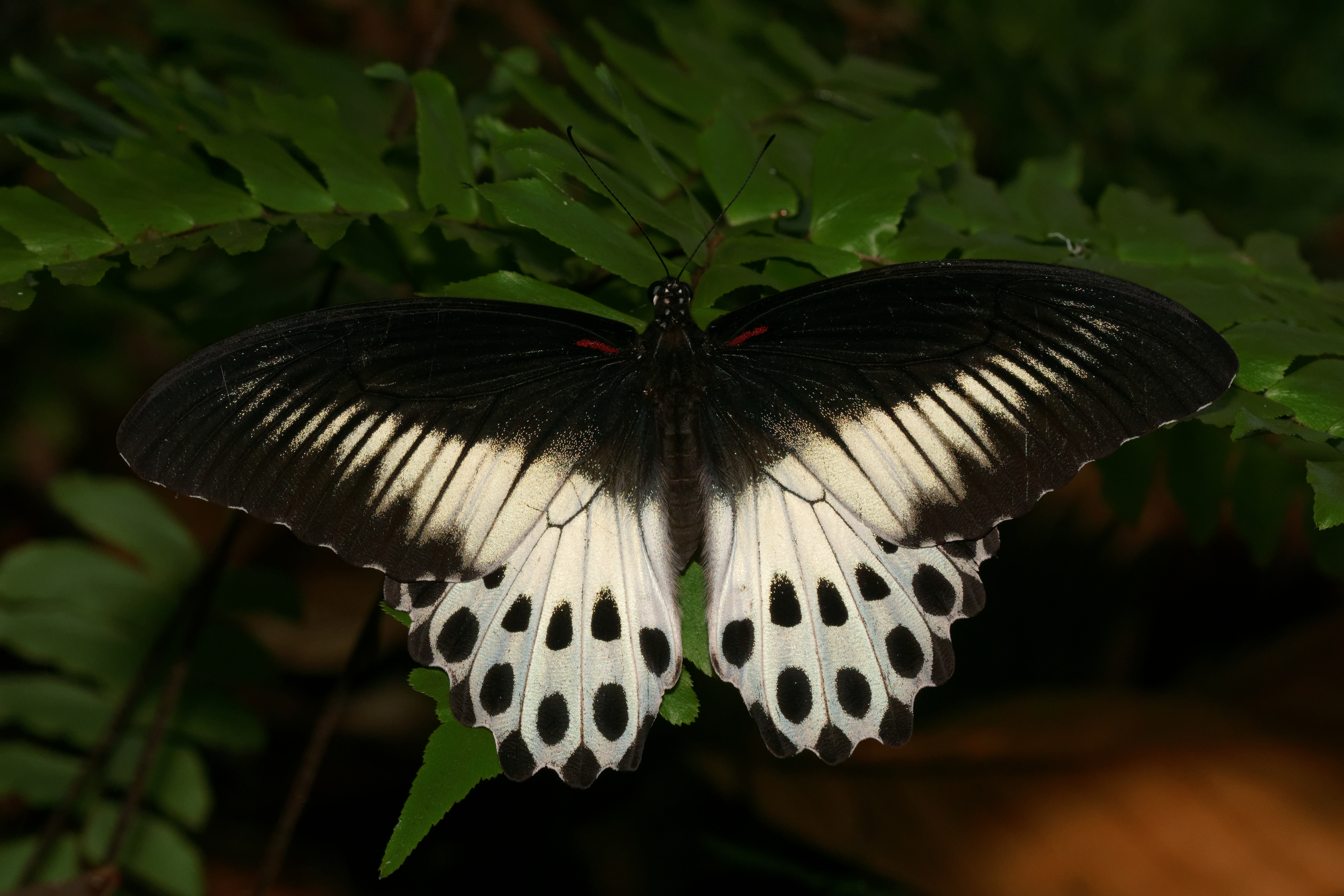
Female specimen with crimson streak on the upperside of the forewing

Female is very similar but the internervular streaks on the forewing paler, extended into the cell both on the upper and undersides. Hindwing: the pale blue area on the upperside and the corresponding grey area on the underside paler. In some specimens there is a diffuse short crimson streak at the base of the cell of the forewing on the upperside.

== Distribution ==
It is widespread across peninsular, central, eastern and north-eastern India. It has been recorded as far north as Haryana, and has also been observed breeding in Gujarat state. It is often seen in gardens and sometimes in the middle of busy traffic of large cities such as Mumbai, Pune and Bangalore. Mark Alexander Wynter-Blyth recorded it in Madhya Pradesh, Jharkhand, West Bengal, Sikkim and Kerala.

== Status ==
It is common and not thought to be threatened. Blue mormons are sometimes killed by vehicular traffic on roads that traverse through wildlife sanctuaries.

== Habitat ==
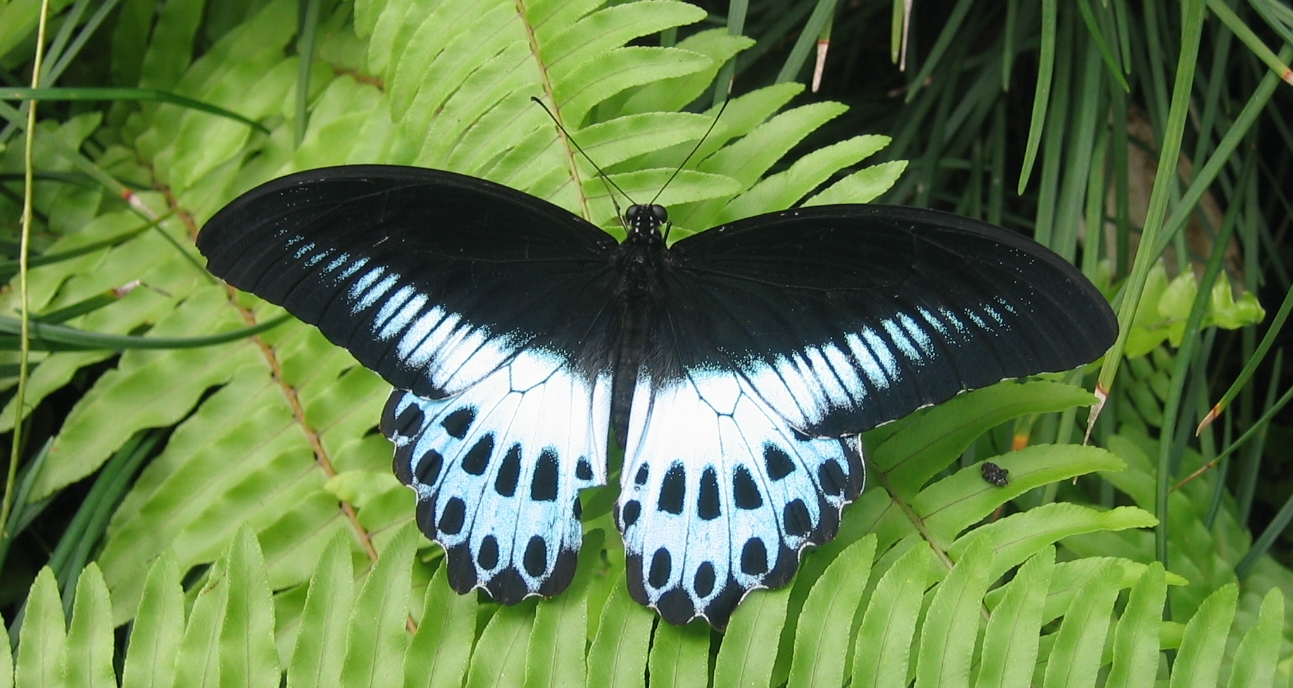

The butterfly is found in a wide diversity of conditions including forests with heavy rainfall areas, deciduous forests and wooded urban areas, and in gardens likely due to the cultivation of Citrus plants which are its host plant.

== Habits ==
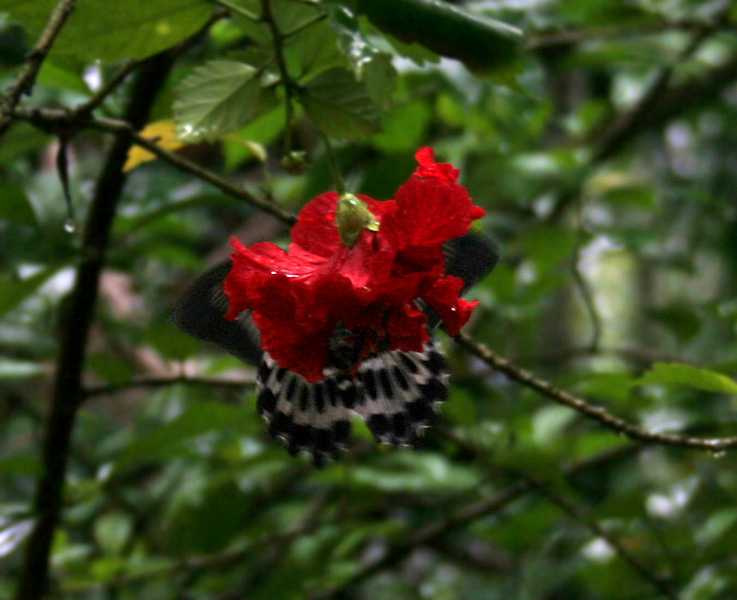
Sipping nectar from a Hibiscus species in Goa, India

This butterfly frequents forest paths and streams. The male is fond of sun and avoids the shade. It frequents flowers especially of Mussaenda frondosa, Ixora coccinea, Jasminum species and Asystasia gangetica. Periodically raids thicker forest patches, especially where Atalantia species are to be found in search of females to mate with. Has a rapid unidirectional flight and frequently changes course, hopping up and down in its flight path. Difficult to catch. Known to bask in the sun. Attracted to damp patch and has greater tolerance to other butterflies and humans while lapping up the mineral rich moisture. Known to visit animal droppings.

The blue Mormon has been recorded as a pollinator of cardamom (Elettaria cardamomum). It is known to mud-puddle.

== Life cycle ==
=== Eggs ===
The eggs are laid singly on the upper surfaces of the leaves on rutaceous plants at ten feet or so above the ground. The newly laid egg is spherical and light green but darkens over time to orange yellow.

=== Caterpillar ===
The newborn caterpillar makes the eggshell its first meal and then rests on a silken bed that it spins for itself near the edge of a leaf. The little caterpillar mimics a bird dropping with its olive green body and white uric acid-like markings. The sheen enhances its resemblance to fresh bird dropping. While small in size, this camouflage permits the caterpillar to rest on the centre of a leaf and nibble around the edges. Later its growing size forces it to keep to twigs and the undersides of leaves except when it is feeding on leaves. It moves slowly and haltingly. It has a unique habit of securing its balance by weaving silk on the substratum.

The caterpillar can be distinguished from the common Mormon, which it resembles, by its larger size, greenish head and a blue streak in the eyespot in segments 4 to 5.

=== Pupa ===
The pupa also resembles that of the common Mormon but is much larger and can be easily distinguished by the prominent folds on the lower side of the abdominal protrusion.

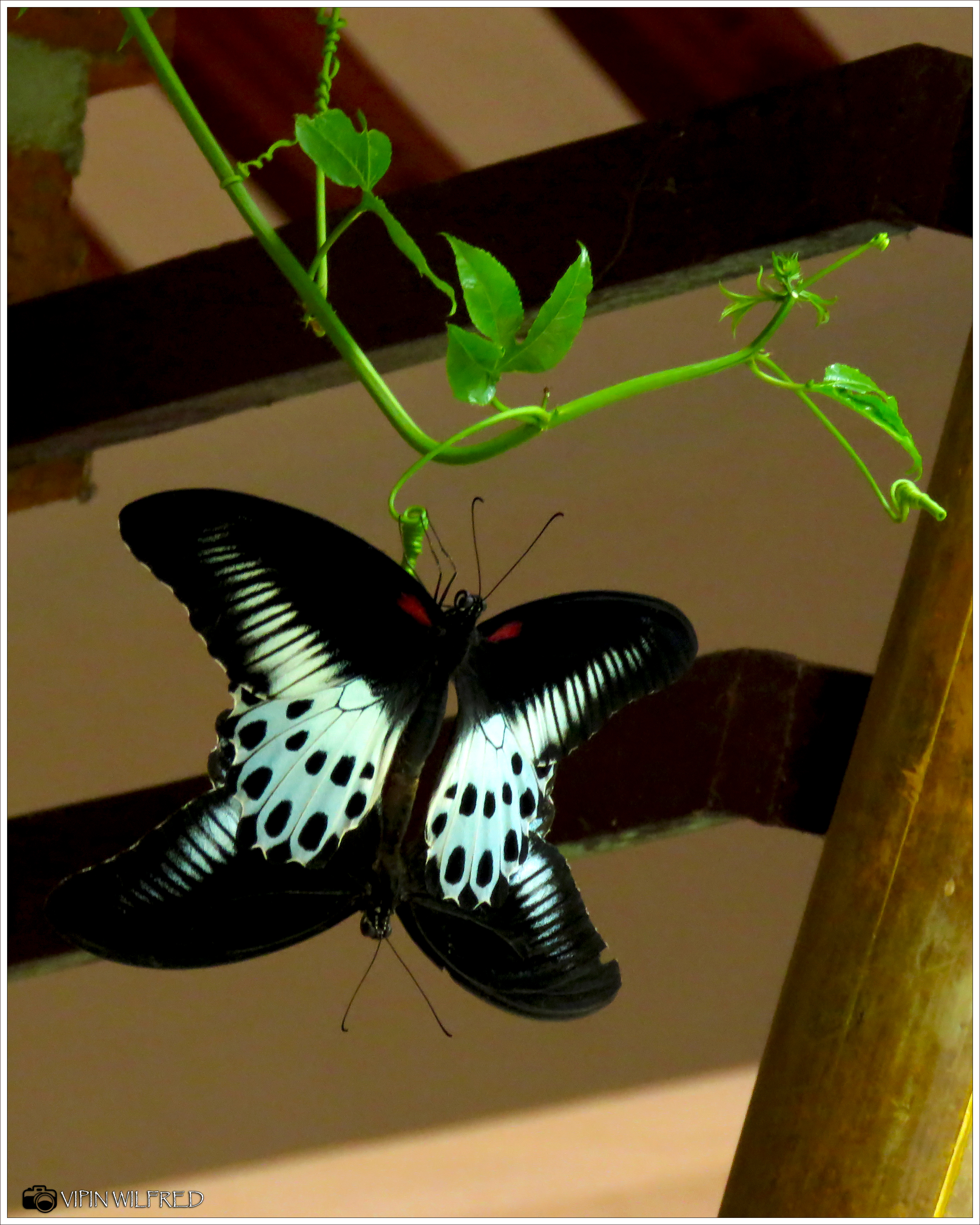
Mating

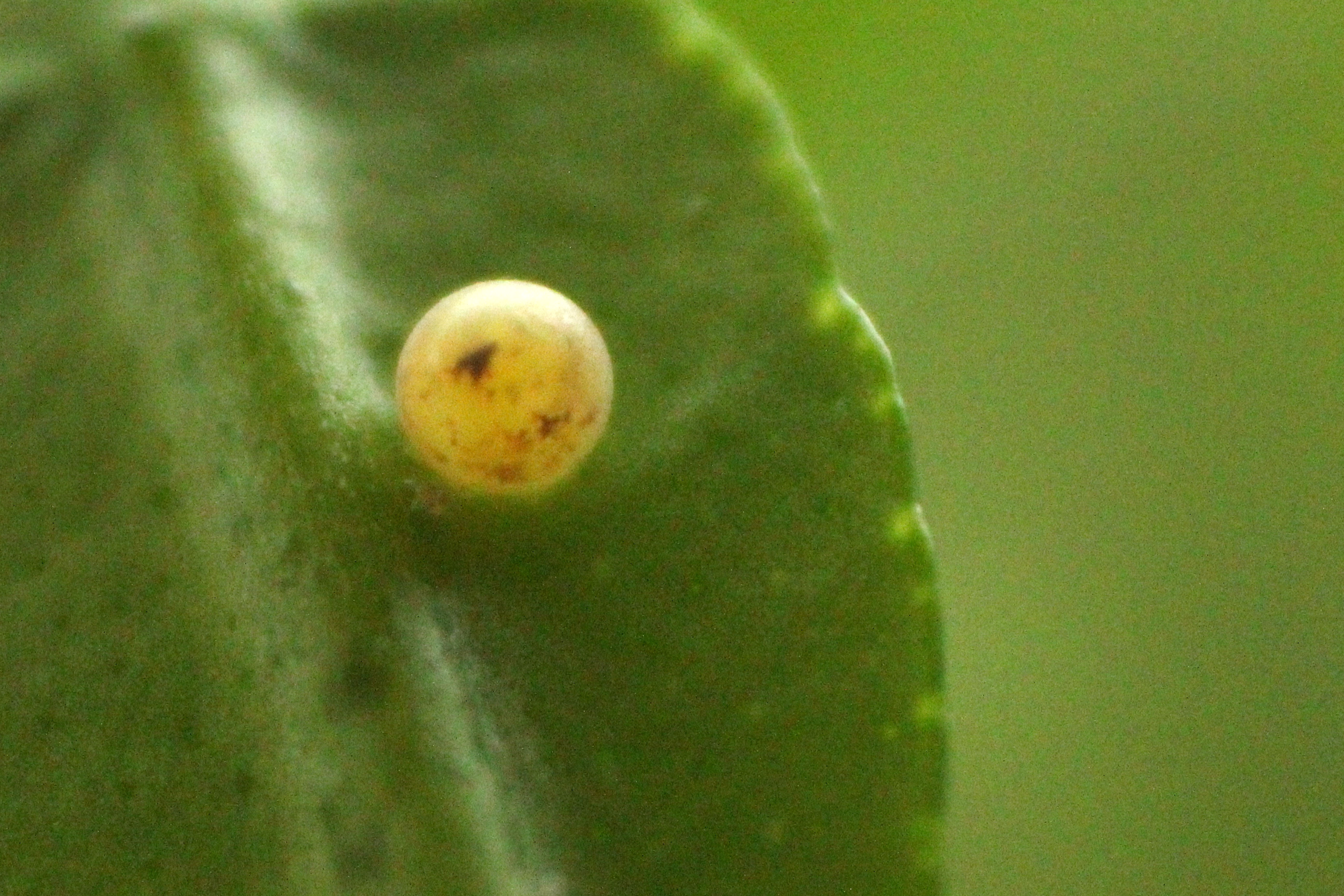
Egg

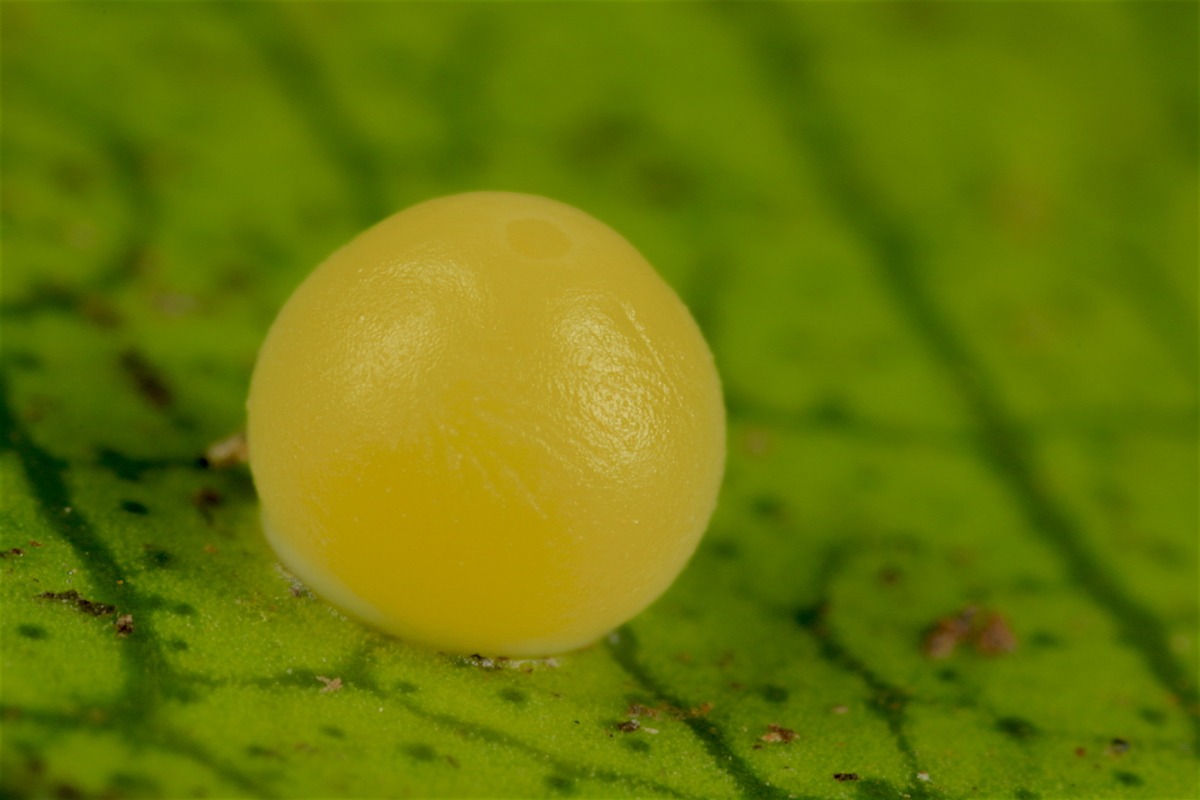
Egg

First instar caterpillar of the Blue Mormon butterfly

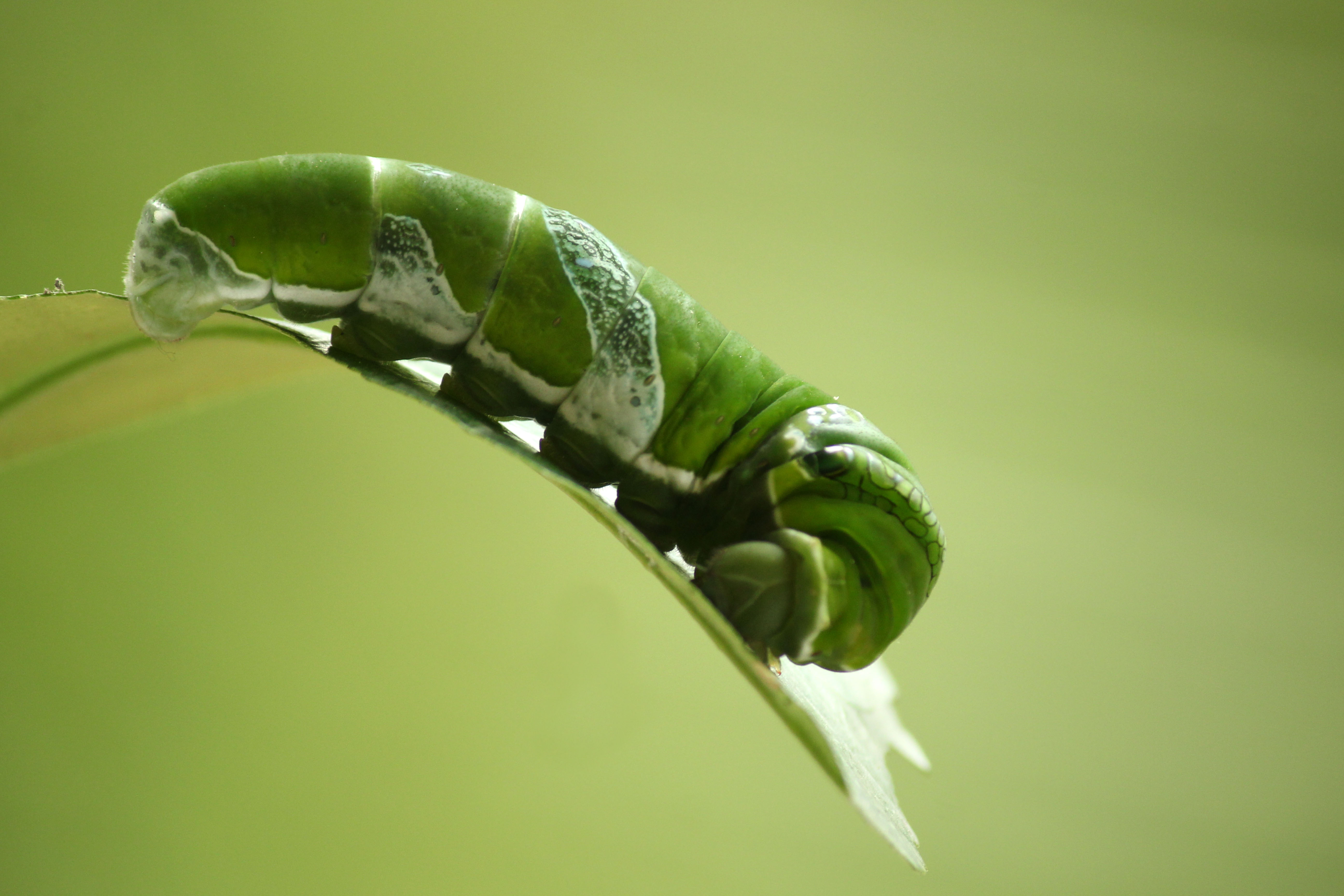
Caterpillar

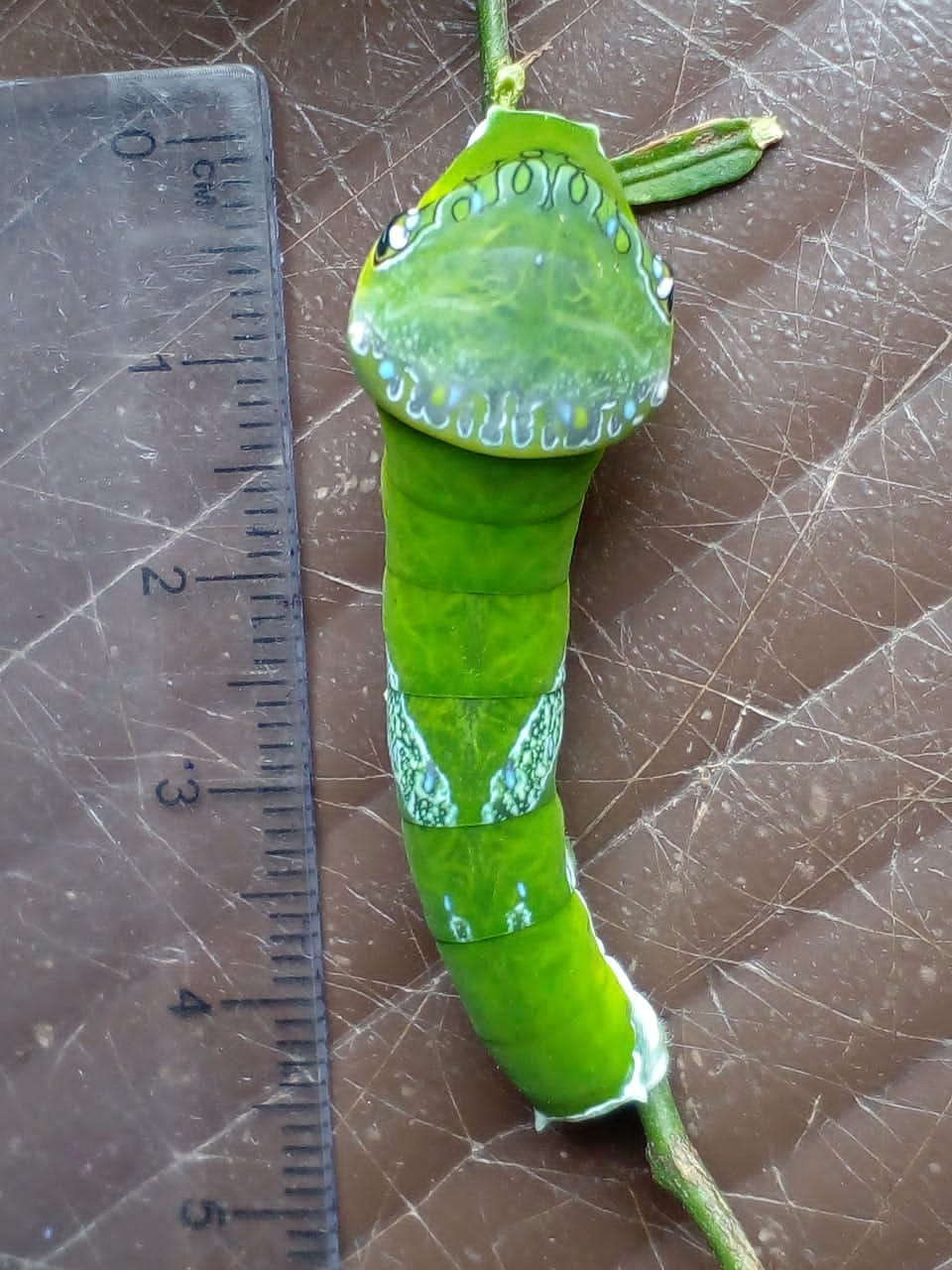
Caterpillar (last instar)

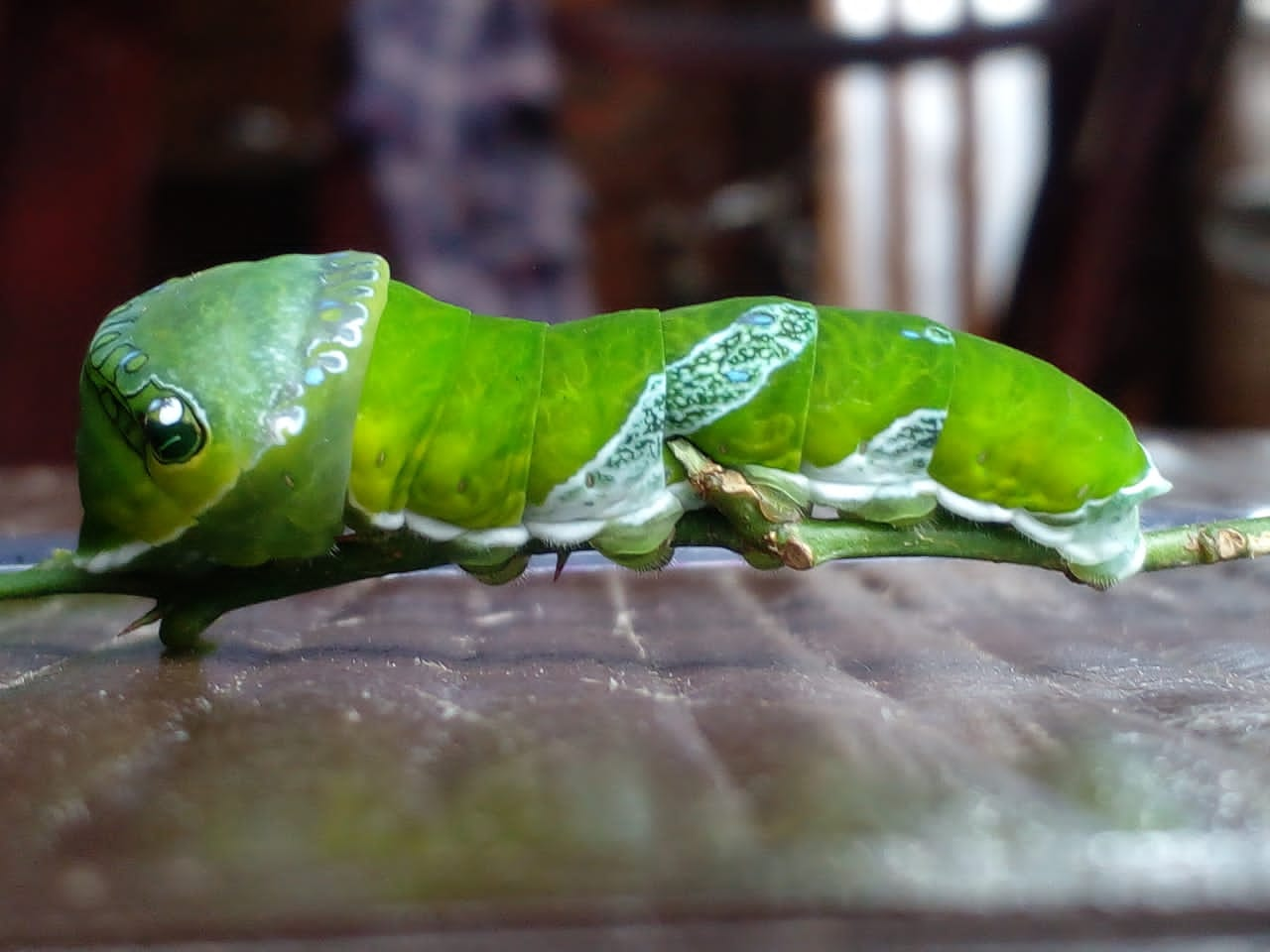
Caterpillar (last instar)

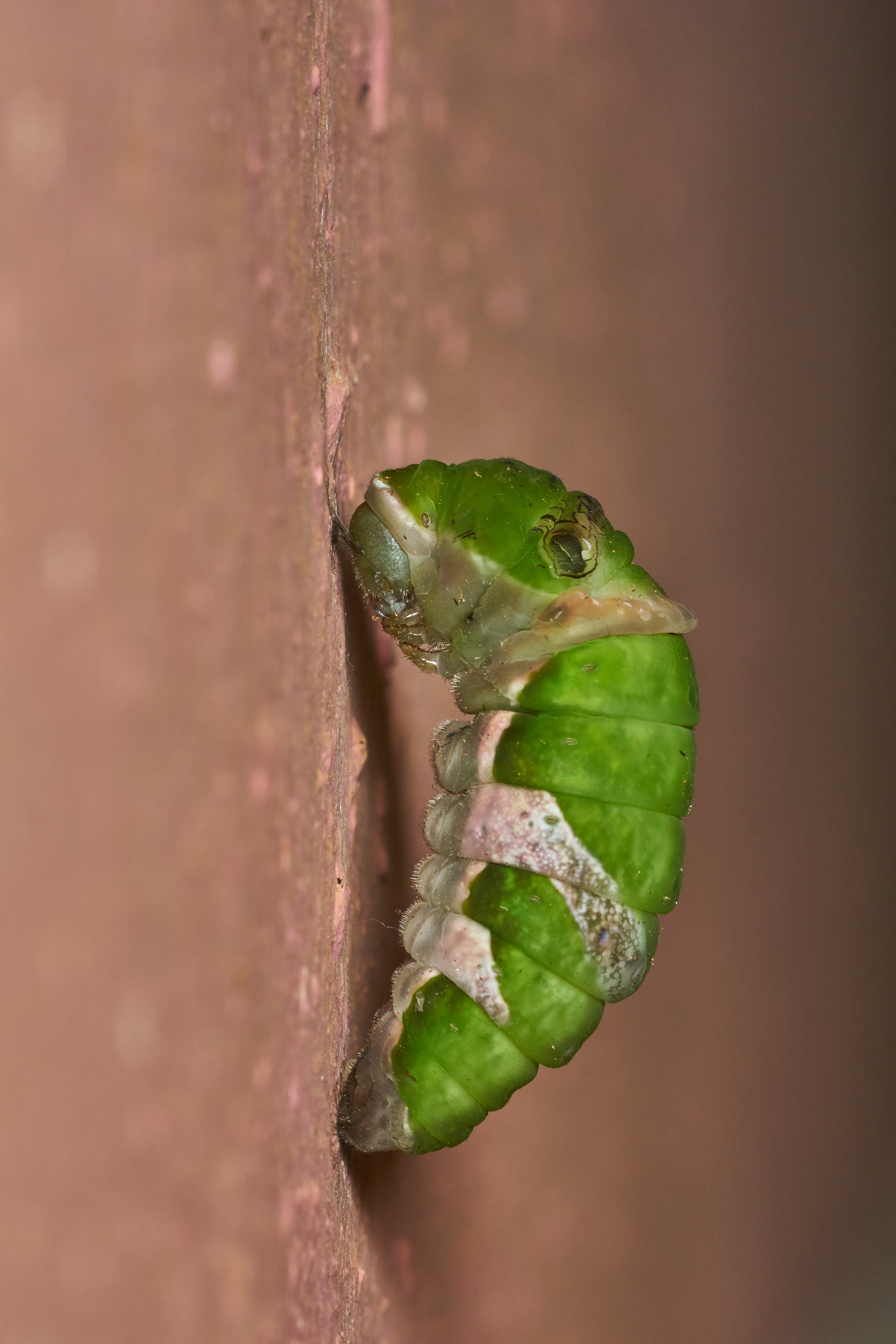
Prepupa

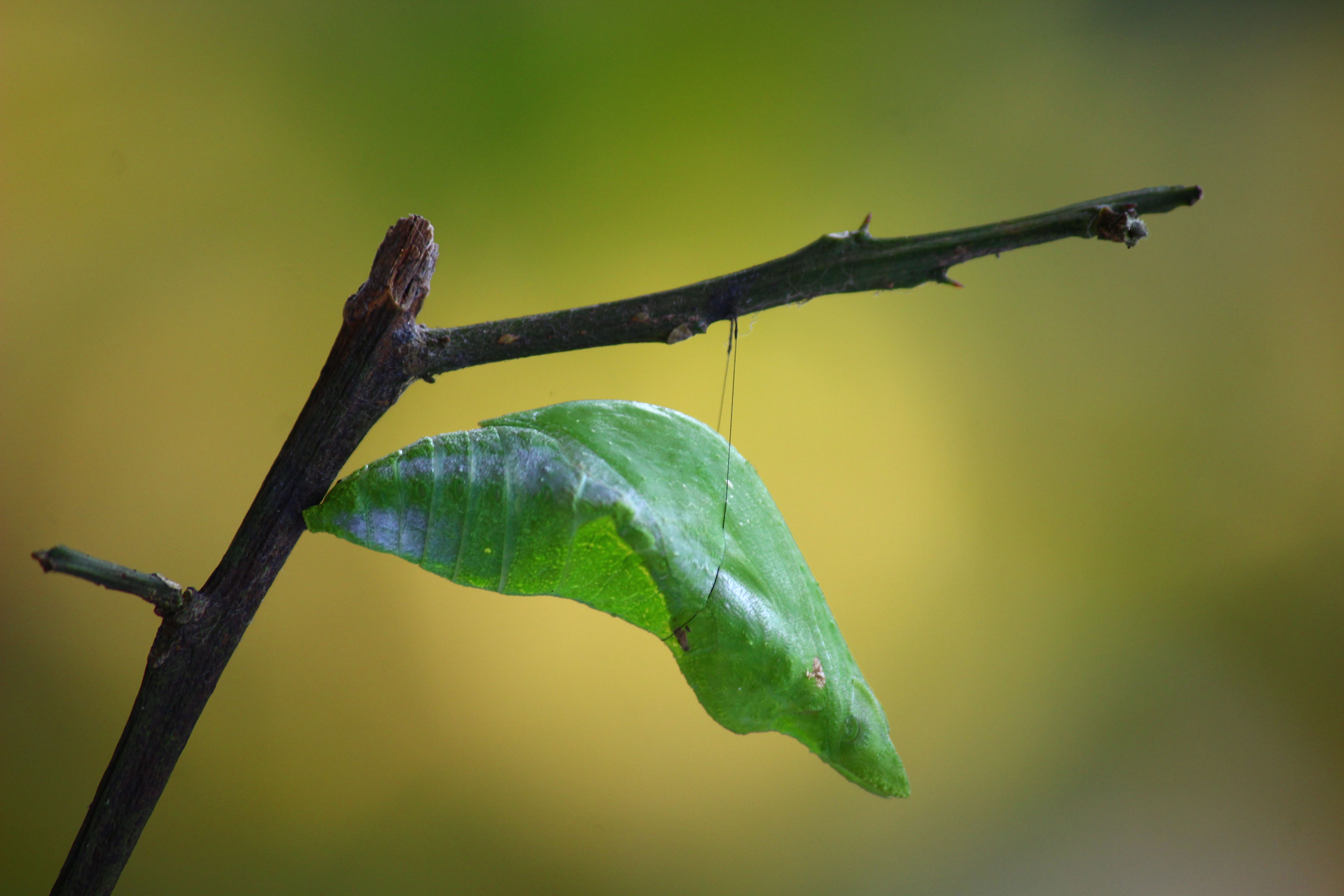
Pupa

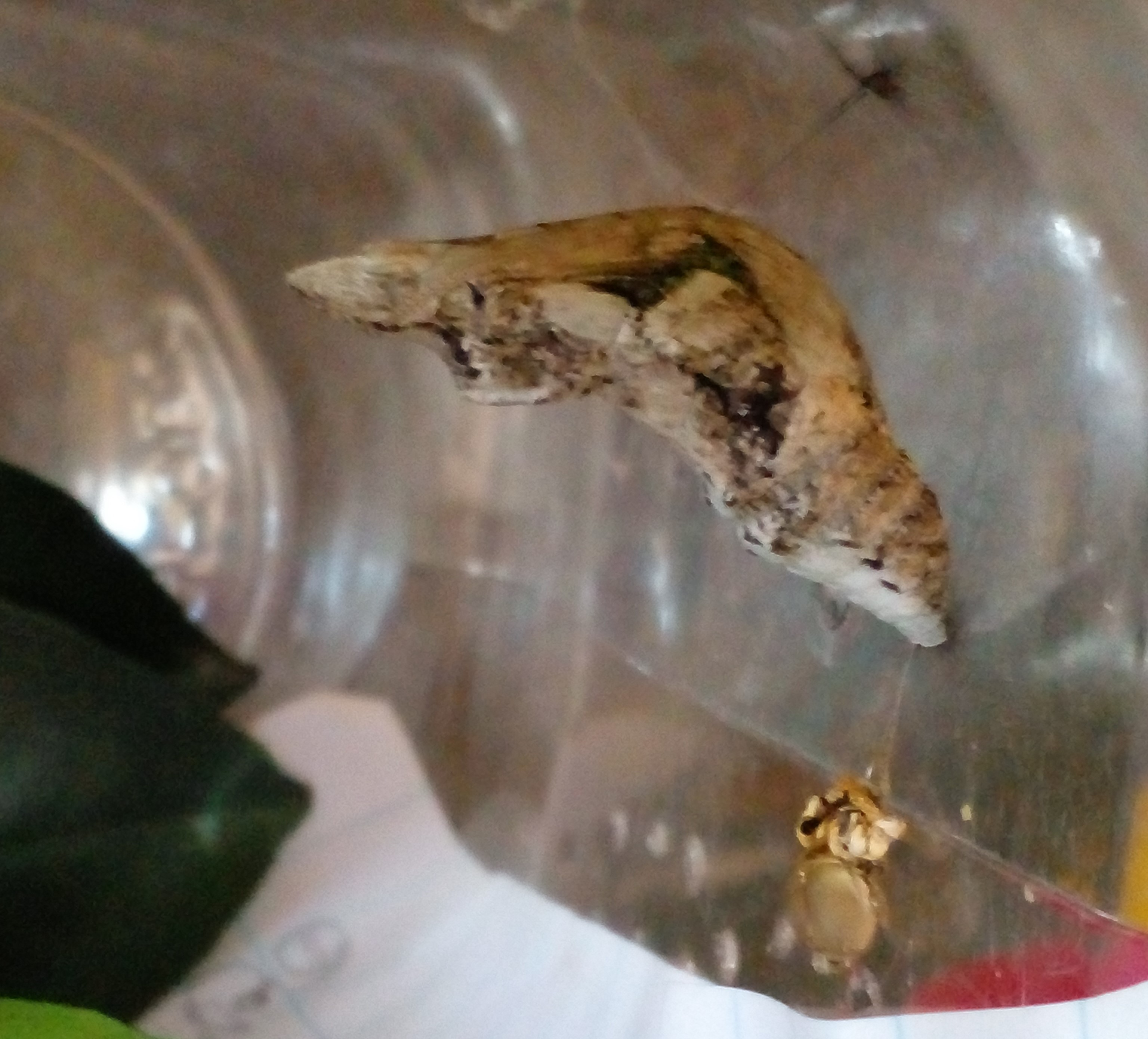
Pupa

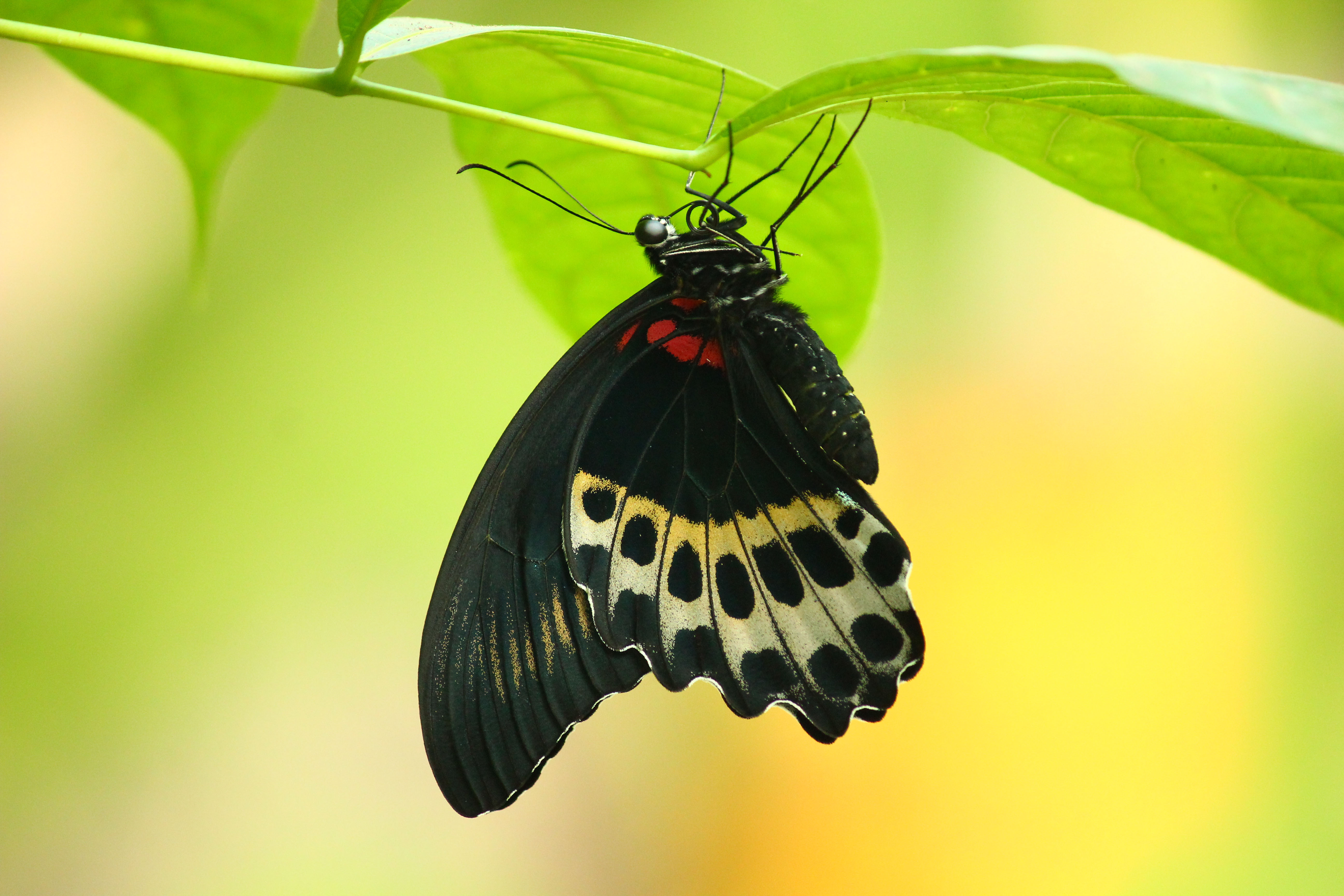
Newly emerged

== Food plants ==
The larva have been recorded to feed on small rutaceous forest trees and large shrubs. The list of host plants includes:

- Atalantia racemosa and Atalantia wightii
- Glycosmis arborea
- Paramigyna monophylla
- Melicope denhamii (Euodia ridleyi)
- Citrus grandis
- Citrus limon
- Aegle marmelos
- Other Citrus cultivars.

== Recognition ==
In June 2015, the Indian blue mormon was declared as the 'State Butterfly' of the state of Maharashtra which became the first state in India to declare a 'State Butterfly'.

== General reading ==
- Collins, N. Mark; Morris, Michael G. (1985). Threatened Swallowtail Butterflies of the World: The IUCN Red Data Book. Gland & Cambridge: IUCN. ISBN 978-2-88032-603-6 – via Biodiversity Heritage Library.
- Evans, W.H. (1932). The Identification of Indian Butterflies (2nd ed.). Mumbai, India: Bombay Natural History Society.
- Gay, Thomas; Kehimkar, Isaac David; Punetha, Jagdish Chandra (1992). Common Butterflies of India. Nature Guides. Bombay, India: World Wide Fund for Nature-India by Oxford University Press. ISBN 978-0195631647.
- Haribal, Meena (1992). The Butterflies of Sikkim Himalaya and Their Natural History. Gangtok, Sikkim, India: Sikkim Nature Conservation Foundation.
- Kunte, Krushnamegh (2000). Butterflies of Peninsular India. India, A Lifescape. Hyderabad, India: Universities Press. ISBN 978-8173713545.
- Wynter-Blyth, Mark Alexander (1957). Butterflies of the Indian Region. Bombay, India: Bombay Natural History Society. ISBN 978-8170192329.
