= Bhimgad Wildlife Sanctuary =

Wildlife sanctuary in Karnataka, India

- IUCN category IV (habitat/species management area)
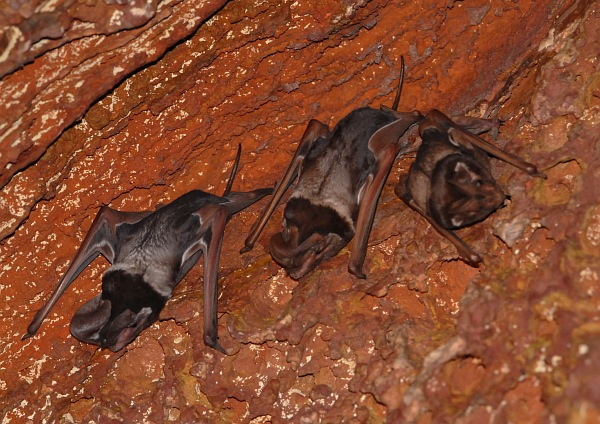
- Critically endangered Wroughton's Free-tailed Bat near Bhimagad Wildlife Sanctuary

- Location within Karnataka Location within India
- Interactive map of Bhimgad Wildlife Sanctuary
- Location: Belgavi, Karnataka, India
- Nearest city: Belagavi, Karnataka
- Coordinates: 15°32′39″N 74°21′03″E
- Area: 190.4 km^{2} (73.5 sq mi)
- Elevation: 800 m (2,600 ft)

Bhimgad Wildlife Sanctuary is a protected area in the Western Ghats, in Khanapur Taluk of Belgavi District near Jamboti Village, Karnataka state, India. This 19,042.58 ha (73.5238 mi^{2}) of Tropical and subtropical moist broadleaf forests forest area was long awaiting to be a wild life sanctuary and finally declared in December 2011.

The Bhimgad forests are notable for the Barapede caves, the only known breeding area of the Wroughton's free-tailed bat, a threatened species on the verge of extinction. The sanctuary is also home to other rare species of flora and fauna.

== Etymology ==
The area takes its name from the Bhimgad Fort which was built and commanded by Shivaji in the 17th century. It is located in the heart of the forest valley, Built by Shivaji to defend from the Portuguese troops who controlled Goa that time, rises 1800 ft near vertically above the plains. The fort occupied the summit of an extraordinary rock, with sides about 300 ft (91 m) in perpendicular height. The defenses were almost entirely natural, requiring little additional construction. The ruins of the 380-ft high and 825-ft broad Bhimgad fort are located right in the heart of the Mahadayi forest, and is of great historical significance.

== Geography ==
The sanctuary is about 35 km (22 mi) southwest from Belgaum city.and 10 km from volpoi(goa) town It is contiguous to the east of Mhadei Wildlife Sanctuary, north-west of the Bhagwan Mahaveer Sanctuary and Mollem National Park and north of Netravali Wildlife Sanctuary in Goa and north of Dandeli Wildlife Sanctuary in Karnataka. The western border areas encompasses several geomorphological limestone formations with several caves.

== Rivers ==
This area is the headwaters of several rivers including the Mhadei, Malaprabha and Tillari and hundreds of perennial streams. The Mhadei originates in the Bhimgad forests with a cluster of 30 springs forming the river Mahadayi, which is joined by two other streams Marcidha nala and Pannera nala. The waters flow down in the valley and over the 150 ft (46 m) Vajrapoha falls. The evening sun falling on the veil gives a glittering touch thus the name vajra. The Mhadei river goes on to be the important Mandovi river in Goa. Notification of this area as a wildlife sanctuary has given protection to Goa's water resources.

== Fauna ==
The application states: "This section of Bhimgad that lies in Karnataka reflects the bewildering complexity in plant, animal and bird life. It represents an area having a unique ecosystem that has significant biological and ecological importance. The region has numerous endemic plants and animals and also provides a critically important tiger corridor between Karnataka and Goa."

The sanctuary, with beautiful mosaic of woodlands and grass lands, is home to tigers, leopards, gaur, sloth bears, sambar, spotted deer, chitals, foxes, wild dogs, king cobras elephants, and other threatened species of mammals, birds and reptiles. The forests are a part of vital tiger corridors – one linking the Dandeli Wildlife Sanctuary and Radhanagri Wildlife Sanctuary in Maharashtra and the other linking Dandeli and the Molem Wildlife Sanctuary.

== Flora ==
The sanctuary is a mosaic of Tropical and subtropical moist broadleaf forests and grasslands. It is rich in medicinal plants.

== External sources ==
Bhimgad
