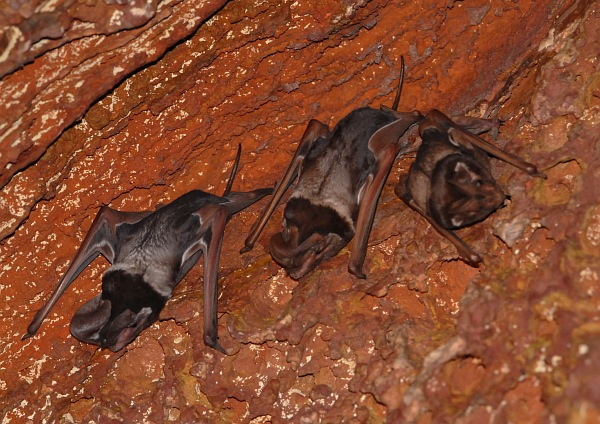
- Wroughton's free-tailed bat (Otomops wroughtoni)

Scientific classification
- Domain: Eukaryota
- Kingdom: Animalia
- Phylum: Chordata
- Class: Mammalia
- Order: Chiroptera
- Family: Molossidae
- Genus: Otomops; Thomas, 1913

Type species
- Nyctinomus wroughtonii Thomas, 1913

= Otomops =

Genus of bats

Otomops is a genus of bat in the family Molossidae. Molecular sequence data supports it as a monophyletic taxon, although not a number of other molossid genera.

Otomops contains the following species:

- O. formosus, Javan mastiff bat
- O. harrisoni, Harrison's large-eared giant mastiff bat
- O. johnstonei, Johnstone's mastiff bat
- O. madagascariensis, Madagascar free-tailed bat
- O. martiensseni, large-eared free-tailed bat
- O. papuensis, big-eared mastiff bat
- O. secundus, mantled mastiff bat
- O. wroughtoni, Wroughton's free-tailed bat
