= Forests in Odisha =

Coordinates: 20.537416°N 84.528709°E

Odisha, one of the 28 states of India, has two basic kinds of forest: in the northeast region of the state the forest is classified as the tropical-moist-deciduous type, blanketing hills, plateaus and other high-altitude isolated areas; in the southwest the tropical-dry-deciduous variety dominate.

Geographical map of Odisha

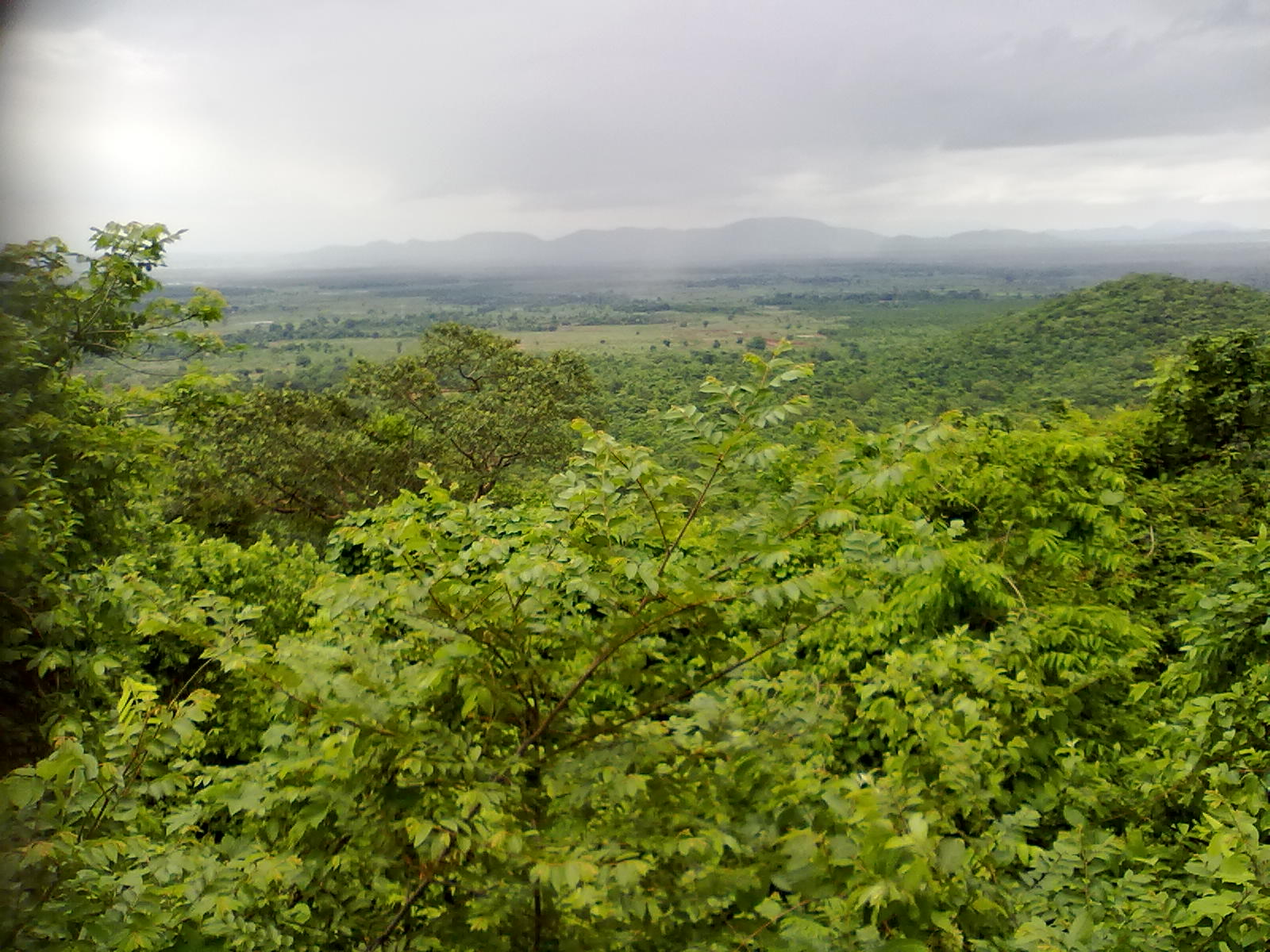
Tropical-moist-deciduous forests in Odisha

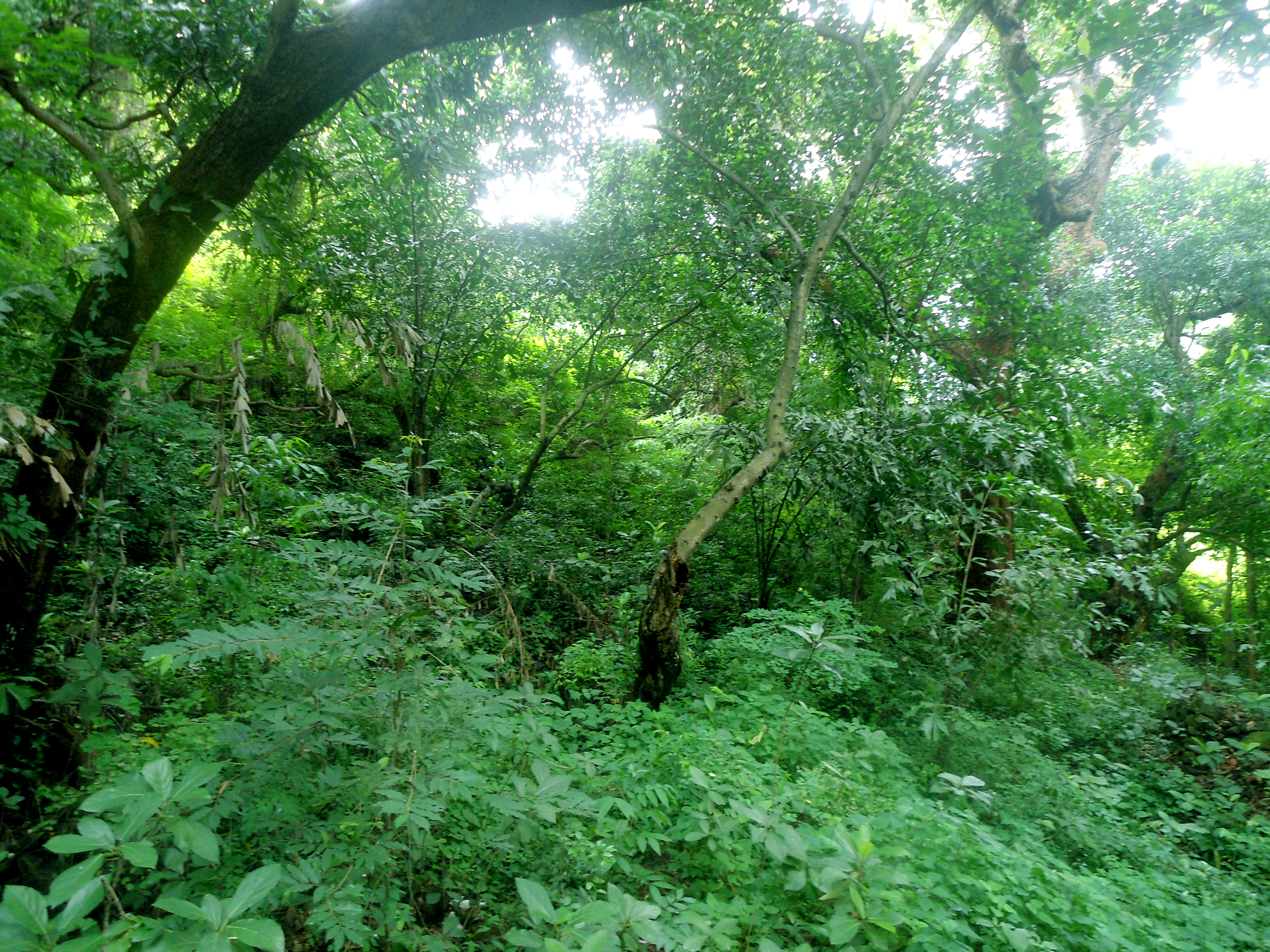
Dry evergreen forests during monsoon

== Features ==
Odisha's forests are vast. Out of the total geographical area of 155,707 km^{2}, the State records 52,472 km^{2} (~33.50%) as some version of forest. The actual forest cover may be less, according to the Forest Survey of India, rosewood, sal, piasal, teak and haldi. The forests' naturally vigorous growth accounts for a tremendous wealth of biodiversity, filling many catalogues of the wild plant and animal species dwelling within.

The state has declared large parcels of land as protected areas with the purpose being to allow animals and plants who are sensitive to cohabitation with humans places of relative freedom from interference and habitat loss. These protected areas constitute 10.37% of the total forest area and 4.1% of the total geographical area of the state.

=== Forest flora ===
The state is home to 3000 plant species including 120 orchid species and 63 varieties of mangrove tree which make the state second largest mangrove ecosystem in India.

A vast variety of other plants is also found in the state, as in the following:

- Acorous calamus
- Aegiceras corniculatus
- Alpinia galanga - greater galingal
- Androgaphis paniculata
- Asparagus racemosus - shatavari
- Cathraranthus roseus
- Celastrus paniculatus
- Centella asiatica
- Cissus quadranggularis
- Clerodendrum ssp.
- Colchicum autumnale - autumn crocus
- Commiphora wightii - Mukul myrrh
- Croton roxburghjii
- Curcuma angustifolia
- Digitalis purpurea - common foxglove
- Diogenin
- Emetin
- Ephedra ssp.
- Erythroxylon coca - coca
- Excoecaria agallochi
- Gloriosa superba
- Gugulipid
- Hemidesmus indicus
- Ocimum basilicum
- Plumbago zeylanica
- Pongamia pinnata
- Rauvolfia serpentina - Indian snakeroot
- Salvadora persica
- seagrass
- Taxus brevifolia - Pacific yew
- Toddalia asiatica
- Vinblastim areteminsinine
- Whighina somenifera

=== Forest fauna ===
The IUCN Red List has recorded a total of 473 species of bird, 86 species of mammal, 19 species of amphibian and 110 species of reptile including three crocodilian species. Out of these around 54 species are considered endangered. Home to a variety of wild animals, the state has declared considerable tracts of land as areas protected for these animals only. These protected areas constitute 10.37% of the total forest area and 4.1% of the total geographical area of the state. Not only this, the state also has the distinction of possessing three mass nesting beaches of endangered olive ridley sea turtles which makes it the largest nesting ground of the species.

The state has three mass nesting beaches of endangered olive ridley sea turtles which when combined makes it the world's largest nesting ground for this species.

Indenting Orissa's ocean coast is Chilika lagoon, a semi-saline wetland used by many species of migratory birds, and also which the endangered Irrawaddy dolphin uses as part of its range. In spite of considerable human interactivity here, the rare dolphin survives. The Orissa government is conducting various programmes to protect the species.

Other animals that call Orissa home, or part-time home, are listed below.

==== Land animals ====
- Asian elephants ହାଥି
- Barking deer
- Blackbucksକୃଷ୍ଣ ସାର ମୁର୍ଗ
- Buffaloes
- Fishing cats
- Flying squirrels
- Four-horned antelopes
- Gaurs
- Green sea turtles
- Langurs
- Leopards
- Mongooses
- Monitor lizards
- Pangolins
- Porcupines
- Pythons
- Sambars
- Sloth bears
- Slow lorises
- Spotted deer
- Tigers
- Turtles
- Wild boars

==== Avians ====
- Alexandrine parakeets
- Asiatic dowitchers
- Avocets
- Black-headed ibis
- Brahminy ducks
- Brahminy kites
- Collared pratincoles
- Coots
- Dalmatian pelicans
- Dunlins
- Egrets
- Gadwalls
- Geese
- Godwits
- Goliath herons
- Greater flamingos
- Grey herons
- Grey hornbills ~ Ocyceros
- Gull-billed terns ~ Gelochelidon nilotica
- Hill mynas ~ Gracula religiosa
- Indian pied hornbills ~ Anthracoceros coronatus
- Indian trogons ~ Harpactes fasciatus
- Jacanas
- Jungle fowls
- Kestrels
- Kingfishers
- Lapwings
- Larks
- Lesser flamingos
- Little cormorants
- Malabar pied hornbills
- Marsh harriers
- Moorhens
- Night herons
- Pallas's fish-eagles
- Pariah kites
- Peacocks
- Peafowls
- Peregrine falcons
- Pintailss
- Plovers
- Pochards
- Pond herons
- Purple herons
- Red jungle fowls
- River terns
- Rollers
- Ruffs
- Sandpipers
- Shovellers
- Snipes
- Spoonbills
- Spoon-billed sandpipers ~ Eurynorhynchus pygmeus
- Spot-billed pelicans
- Stilts
- Storks
- Teals
- Wagtails
- White-bellied sea eagles
- Wild ducks

== Statistics ==
Statistics of Forest Cover by District in Odisha, FSI-2023
| District | % of Forest Area in the District | Total Forest Area (km²) | Very Dense Forest (km²) | Modest Dense Forest Area (km²) | Open Forest Area (km²) |
|---|---|---|---|---|---|
| Angul | 43.51 | 2773.94 | 371.48 | 1373.67 | 1028.79 |
| Balangir | 17.6 | 1157.28 | 69.07 | 227.59 | 860.62 |
| Baleswar | 10.3 | 392.18 | 22.63 | 132.14 | 237.41 |
| Bargarh | 18.54 | 1082.25 | 175.97 | 374.94 | 531.34 |
| Baudh | 42.21 | 1307.52 | 266.01 | 569.03 | 472.48 |
| Bhadrak | 2.98 | 74.65 | 0.12 | 9.14 | 65.39 |
| Cuttack | 20.81 | 818.29 | 51.98 | 233.51 | 532.8 |
| Deogarh | 50.47 | 1483.96 | 193.13 | 672.19 | 618.64 |
| Dhenkanal | 32.33 | 1439.27 | 172.6 | 436.89 | 829.78 |
| Gajapati | 57.78 | 2498.8 | 328.49 | 722.53 | 1447.78 |
| Ganjam | 29.44 | 2415.69 | 174.74 | 1114.2 | 1126.75 |
| Jagatsinghpur | 8.45 | 140.94 | 0 | 4.83 | 136.11 |
| Jajapur | 10.78 | 312.65 | 5.49 | 74.2 | 232.96 |
| Jharsuguda | 15.8 | 328.89 | 2.75 | 169.72 | 156.42 |
| Kalahandi | 30.01 | 2376.91 | 368.1 | 713.87 | 1294.94 |
| Kandhamal | 67.35 | 5402.03 | 653.03 | 2598.55 | 2150.45 |
| Kendrapara | 12.45 | 329.18 | 81.55 | 86.53 | 161.1 |
| Kendujhar | 38.41 | 3189.08 | 290.04 | 1412.3 | 1486.74 |
| Khordha | 18.86 | 530.4 | 22.19 | 188.73 | 319.48 |
| Koraput | 23.79 | 2095.29 | 52.23 | 549.61 | 1493.45 |
| Malkangiri | 39.92 | 2311.5 | 159.66 | 707.4 | 1444.44 |
| Mayurbhanj | 39.34 | 4098.74 | 1329.22 | 1743.49 | 1026.03 |
| Nabarangpur | 22.24 | 1176.53 | 154.08 | 424.95 | 597.5 |
| Nayagarh | 45.43 | 1767.13 | 191.33 | 981.82 | 593.98 |
| Nuapada | 36.04 | 1388.25 | 106.25 | 536.46 | 745.54 |
| Puri | 8.19 | 285.03 | 0 | 53.63 | 231.4 |
| Rayagada | 46.46 | 3286.25 | 385.49 | 1185.77 | 1714.99 |
| Sambalpur | 49.88 | 3320.29 | 536.47 | 1724.59 | 1059.23 |
| Subarnapur | 17.23 | 402.77 | 43.08 | 195.52 | 164.17 |
| Sundargarh | 43.74 | 4247.87 | 1017.24 | 1847.75 | 1382.88 |
| Total | 33.67 | 52433.56 | 7224.42 | 21065.55 | 24143.59 |

== See also ==
- Geography of Odisha
