= Netravali Wildlife Sanctuary =

Located at Goa, India

- IUCN category IV (habitat/species management area)
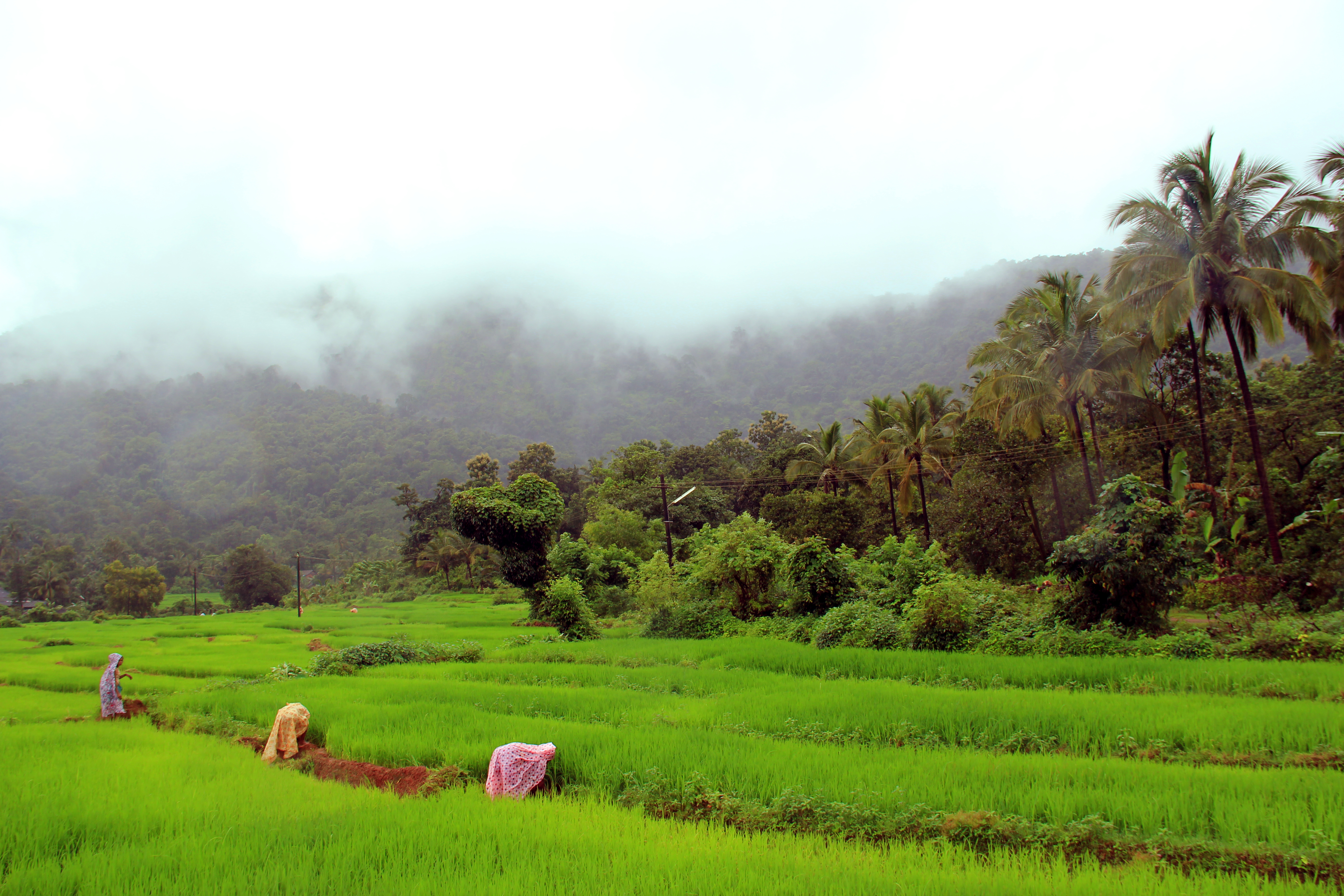
- Interactive map of Netravali Wildlife Sanctuary
- Location: Kushavati district , Goa
- Area: 211 km^{2} (81 sq mi)
- Established: 1999

Netravali Wildlife Sanctuary is located in South-Eastern Goa, India. It constitutes one of the vital corridors of the Western Ghats and covers an area of about 211km^{2}. Netravali or Neturli is an important tributary of River Zuari, which originates in the sanctuary. Forests mostly consist of moist deciduous vegetation interspersed with evergreen and semi-evergreen habitat; there are also two all-season waterfalls in the sanctuary.

== Location ==
Netravali Wildlife Sanctuary is located in Verlem, in the Sanguem Taluka region of South-Eastern Goa, around 65km from Goa Airport. It is adjacent to Dandeli-Anshi Tiger Reserve, Karnataka on the eastern side, Cotigao Wildlife Sanctuary, Goa on the southern side and Bhagwan Mahaveer Sanctuary and Mollem National Park on the northern side which in turn forms a contiguous protected area along with Madei Wildlife Sanctuary, Goa and Bhimgad Wildlife Sanctuary, Karnataka.

== Flora and fauna ==
The sanctuary sustains a good mammal population due to its rich habitat and plenty of perennial streams. Gaur or Indian Bison (Bos gaurus), Malabar giant squirrel (Ratufa indica), four-horned antelope or chousingha (Tetracerus quadricornis), leopard (Panthera pardus), black sloth bear along with a host of other predators and herbivores find home in the sanctuary. Birds like the rare Malayan night heron (Gorsachius melanolophus), Nilgiri wood pigeon (Columba elphinstonii), great pied hornbill (Buceros bicornis), grey-headed bulbul (Pycnonotus priocephalus), white-bellied blue flycatcher (Cyornis pallipes), Wynaad laughingthrush (Garrulax delesserti), white-bellied treepie (Dendrocitta leucogastra), rufous babbler (Turdoides subrufa) have been sighted many times in the sanctuary. The sanctuary is a host for many rare butterfly species including the Malabar banded swallowtail (Papilio liomedon), Malabar banded peacock (Papilio buddha), Malabar tree nymph (Idea malabarica), southern birdwing (Troides minos), blue nawab (Polyura schreiber), black rajah (Charaxes solon) and redspot duke (Dophla evelina).

The sanctuary also hosts remnants of ancient forests featuring the distinctive Myristica swamp ecosystem, which dates back over 100 million years.
