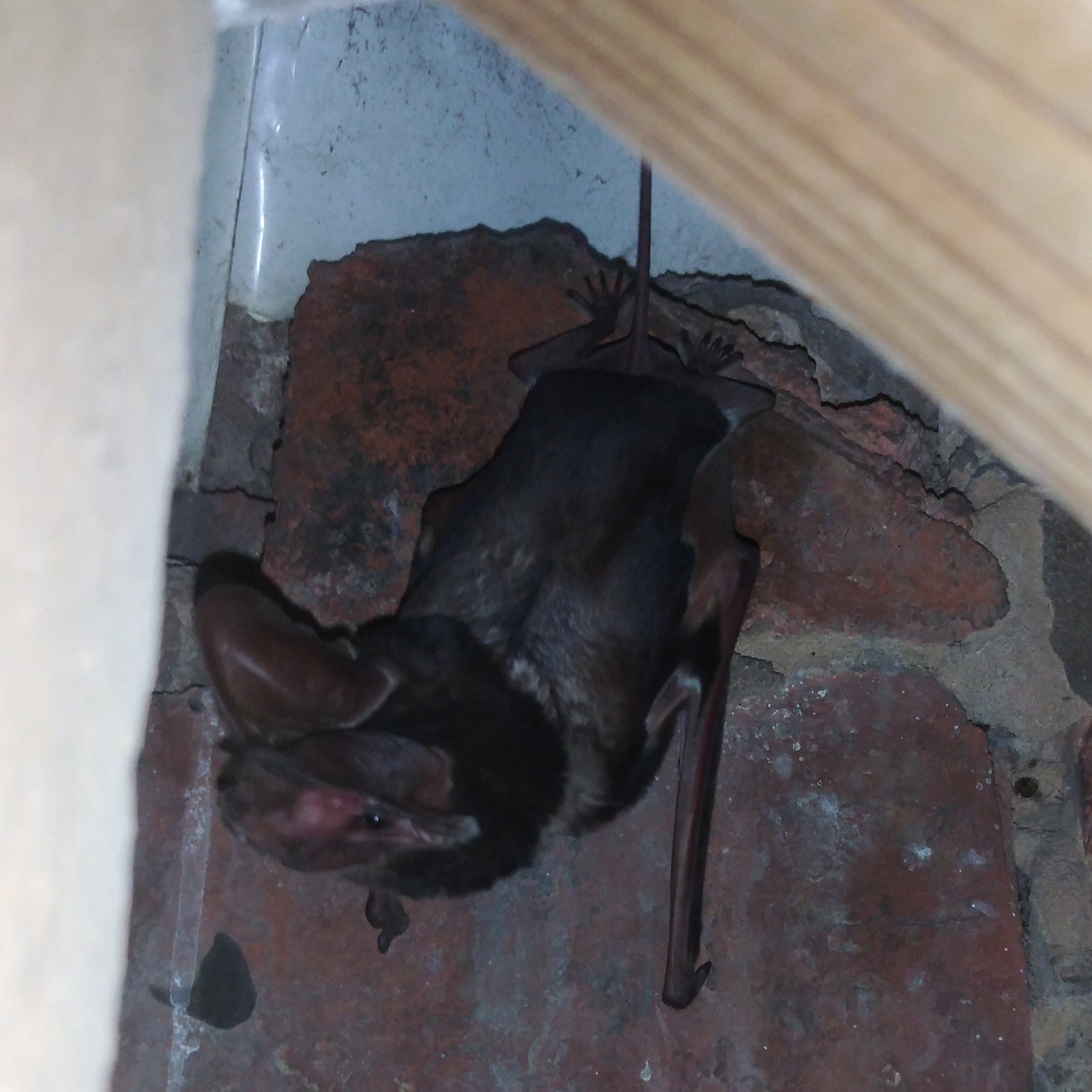

Conservation status
- Near Threatened (IUCN 3.1)

Scientific classification
- Kingdom: Animalia
- Phylum: Chordata
- Class: Mammalia
- Order: Chiroptera
- Family: Molossidae
- Genus: Otomops
- Species: O. martiensseni

Binomial name
- Otomops martiensseni Matschie, 1897
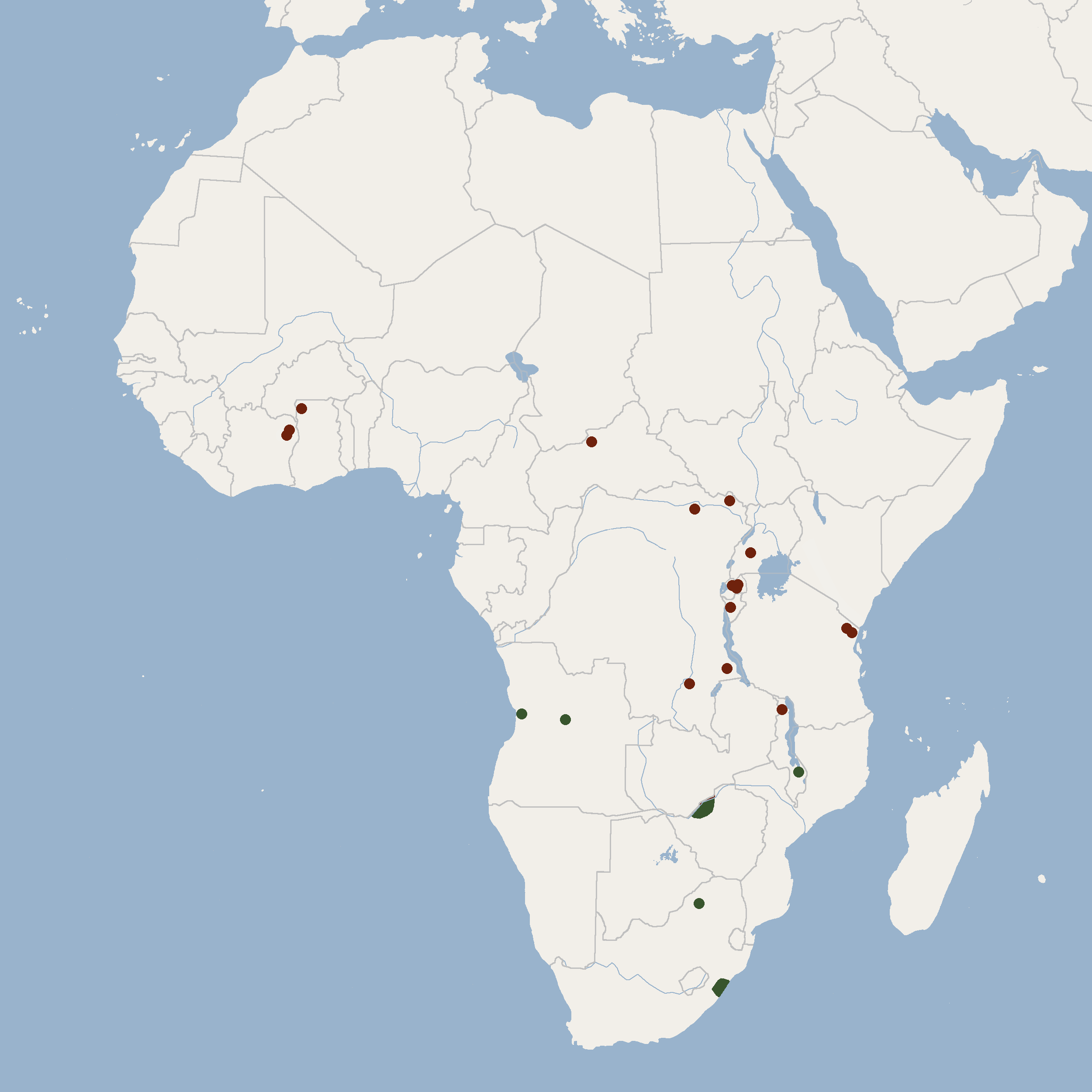

= Large-eared free-tailed bat =

Species of bat

The large-eared free-tailed bat (Otomops martiensseni) is a species of bat in the family Molossidae native to Africa.

It is found in Angola, Central African Republic, Democratic Republic of the Congo, Ivory Coast, Djibouti, Ethiopia, Ghana, Kenya, Malawi, Rwanda, South Africa, Tanzania, Uganda, Yemen, Zambia, and Zimbabwe, and possibly Madagascar. Its natural habitats are subtropical or tropical dry forest, subtropical or tropical moist lowland forest, subtropical or tropical moist montane forest, dry savanna, arable land, and plantations.
