= Annekal Reserved Forest =

Protected area in Karnataka, India

- Interactive map of Annekal Reserved Forest
- Location: India
- Coordinates: 12.704°N 77.591°E

Annekal Reserved Forest is a protected area in the Western Ghats of Karnataka, India. It is said to be one of the largest reserved forests in India.
