= Mhadei Wildlife Sanctuary =

Wildlife sanctuary in Goa, India

- IUCN category IV (habitat/species management area)
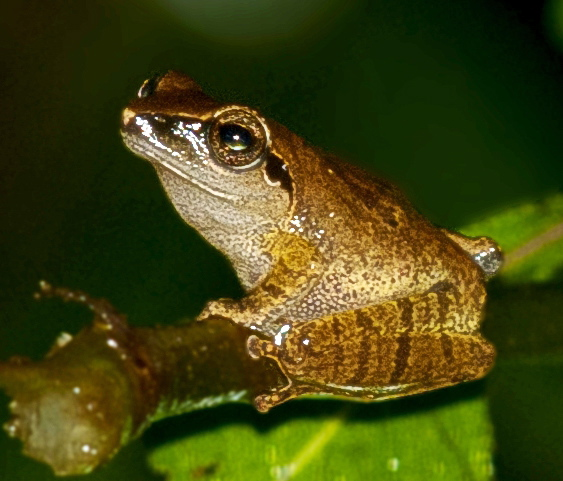
- Pseudophilautus amboli in Mhadei Wildlife Sanctuary

- Location within Goa Location within India
- Interactive map of Mhadei Wildlife Sanctuary
- Location: North Goa, Goa, India
- Nearest city: Valpoi
- Coordinates: 15°34′18″N 74°10′15″E
- Area: 208.48 km^{2} (80.49 sq mi)
- Elevation: 800 m (2,600 ft)
- Established: 18 May 1999

Mhadei Wildlife Sanctuary is a 208.5 km^{2} (80.5 sq mi) protected area in the Indian state of Goa in the North Goa District, Sattari taluka administered by the Goa State Forest Department. It is under consideration to become a tiger reserve because of the presence of Bengal tigers.

== Infrastructure ==
The sanctuary is administered by the Goa State Forest Department. The range forest officer of Mhadei Wildlife Sanctuary is Vishwas Chodankar. The RFO office is near the Forest Department office in Valpoi. The sanctuary is protected by 11 forest guards, under the supervision of three round foresters. The sanctuary is divided into 16 beats, with the three round foresters stationed in Kodal, Charavane and Caranzol in Sattari taluka. The sanctuary office has a four-wheel-drive vehicle and a motorcycle for patrolling.

== Geography ==
Goa is the only state in India which has protected the complete Western Ghats' section within a state. Goa's four wildlife sanctuaries are located on the eastern side of the state in the Western Ghats, covering an area of about 750 km^{2} (290 sq mi). Mahdei Wildlife Sanctuary and Bhagwan Mahaveer Sanctuary and Mollem National Park all fall within the Mhadei River basin.

Bhimgad Forests, Mhadei Wildlife Sanctuary, Goa, India

Climate chart (precipitation, max. and min. temperature)
| J | F | M | A | M | J | J | A | S | O | N | D |
| 1 30 17 | 1 31 18 | 1 33 20 | 1 34 22 | 1 33 23 | 1 29 22 | 1 27 21 | 1 27 21 | 1 28 21 | 1 30 21 | 1 30 19 | 1 30 17 |
- █ Average max. and min. temperatures in °C
- █ Precipitation totals in mm
Imperial conversion
| J | F | M | A | M | J | J | A | S | O | N | D |
| 0 86 62 | 0 89 64 | 0 92 69 | 0 93 72 | 0 91 74 | 0 84 72 | 0 80 71 | 0 80 71 | 0 82 70 | 0 86 69 | 0 86 66 | 0 85 63 |
- █ Average max. and min. temperatures in °F
- █ Precipitation totals in inches

Elevations among the hills of the sanctuary range from 560 m (1,840 ft) in the center to 200 m (660 ft) in the west. The sanctuary includes the Vagheri Hills, some of the highest peaks in North Goa. Vagheri peak at elevation560 m (1,840 ft), the highest in the sanctuary, is near the village of Keri in Sanquelim. Other peaks in Goa include Sonsogor, the highest in Goa at 1,166 m (3,825 ft), Catlanchimauli 1,107 m (3,632 ft), Vaguerim 1,100 m (3,600 ft) and Morlemchogar1,000 m (3,300 ft).

The Mhadei River, known downstream as the Mandovi River, the lifeline of the state of Goa, originates in Karnataka, passes 9.4 km (5.8 mi) through the Mahdei Wildlife Sanctuary and meets the Arabian Sea at Panaji after traveling 81.2 km (50.5 mi) in Goa.

=== Waterfalls ===
Mhadei Wildlife Sanctuary has many waterfalls, especially the twin 143 m (469 ft) Vazra Sakla waterfalls and the Virdi Falls in the Chorla Ghats region on the escarpment of the Goa-Maharashtra-Karnataka border in the Swapnagandha valley forest near Virdi village. The 16 waterfalls at 1.5 km (0.93 mi) up from Hivre village are 15.5 km (9.6 mi) from the Valpoi.

The Ladkyacho Vozar plunge waterfall, 1.5 km (0.93 mi) northeast of Surla, Goa's highest village is at Bhagwan Mahaveer Sanctuary and Mollem National Park, and Netravali Wildlife Sanctuary is located just to the south of Mhadei in Goa.

== Fauna ==
This region is part of the Western Ghats landscape, and is regarded as a Global Biodiversity Hotspot.

Other mammals seen in the sanctuary include the tiger, leopard, sloth bear, gaur, ruddy mongoose, Asian palm civet, small Indian civet, dhole, jungle cat, mouse deer, wild boar, Indian hare, giant squirrel, flying squirrel, gray langur, Indian pangolin, slender loris, bonnet macaque.

Mhadei Wildlife Sanctuary is an International Bird Area (IN177) which satisfies IBA criterion: A1. Globally threatened species, A2. Restricted-range species and A3. Biome-restricted species. IBA trigger species here are: Nilgiri wood-pigeon, Malabar parakeet, Malabar grey hornbill, grey-headed bulbul, rufous babbler, white-bellied blue-flycatcher and crimson-backed sunbird. A total of 255 bird species have been recorded in the Sanctuary. Of these, 53 showed direct signs of breeding here.

Snakes in the Mhadei Valley and Mhadei Wildlife Sanctuary include all of the "Big Four" venomous snakes in India: common krait, Russell's viper, saw-scaled viper, spectacled cobra, banded kukri snake, Nilgiri keelback, black slender coral snake, brahminy blind snake, checkered keelback, collared cat snake, common bronzeback, common Indian cat snake, common sand boa, common wolf snake, common vine snake, copper-headed trinket snake, green pit viper, hump-nosed pit viper, Indian rat snake, Indian rock python, king cobra, Malabar pit viper, ocellated shield tail, ornate flying snake, red sand boa, streaked Kukri snake, striped keelback, Travancore wolf snake, tree snake, Whitaker's sand boa and the yellow-spotted wolf snake. Endemic species of amphibians in the sanctuary include the marbled ramanella, Maharashtra bush frog, Beddome's leaping frog and Malabar gliding frog.

Mhadei area is known for three rare species of caecilians, Nadkarni's caecilian, which was recently discovered in Keri village.

The largest butterfly in South India, the southern birdwing, and the striped tiger, common jezebel, common Indian crow, blue Mormon and other species of butterflies also occur. Prominent among these is the blue tiger butterfly, which can be found until the summer.

== Flora and Funga ==
=== Sacred groves ===
Sacred groves were once common at almost all villages in Sattari. They traditionally render protection to a variety of flora and fauna. Copardem is a village famed for the sacred grove tradition known locally as Devachi rai, a tradition of community conservation carried out in the name of the local deity. Formerly spread across 37,620 m^{2} (404,900 sq ft) of government land, much of the sacred grove is now encroached upon for cashew plantations and agriculture. The sacred grove is an excellent example of the old tradition of villagers protecting their environment.

Among its variety of flora are towering trees such as shidam (Tetrameles nudiflora) which support various other life forms in the grove. Creepers like garkani (Entada scandens) with their sword-like pods are found on the shidam, while the tree also houses beehives. The grove also has an evergreen species of Ashoka, which bears unique saffron-coloured flowers. During the monsoon, bioluminescent fungi growing on dead wood glitter at night. The grove is also conducive for the growth of a variety of edible mushrooms, such as roen alami, khutyali, sonyali and shringar. In addition to mammals, the tall trees attract birds, including the crested serpent eagle, Malabar grey hornbill and great hornbill.

Nanoda village has an ancient tradition of nature worship. It is etymologically related to the naked woman tree, locally known as the nano (Euphorbia tirucalli - pencil tree). Ancestors who lived in harmony with nature evolved the tradition of protecting the forest in honour of the local deity. Nanoda has two sacred groves named Nirankarachi Rai after the holy spirit Nirankar: one lies on the border of Maloli and Nanoda and the other in Nanoda. The latter is slowly being weathered away by changing values and encroachments. In the past, large areas of forest land were protected through sacred groves such as Nirankarachi Rai. One would find various species of indigenous trees in these groves and no one dared cut a tree. In this way, villagers ensured their protection. The densely forested groves were also used by villagers to keep sculptures of village deities. Today, because of encroachments, the size of the groves has decreased, while the sculptures lie exposed to the vagaries of nature. Nanoda's Nirankarachi Rai, formerly spread across a large area, is now confined to a small patch where hedu, khait (Mimosa catechu) and chafara trees are found. Majestic trees such as bhillo maad have already been felled.

Inside the sacred grove are 15 stone sculptures of Gajlaxmi, Mahishasurmardini, Ravalnath, Brahmani, a horse rider and warriors-which are a part of Goa's archaeological heritage, weathering away. Animals such as sheryo (pangolin) and shekaro (Malabar giant squirrel) are found in sacred groves.

== Threats ==
Threats to the unique ecology and biodiversity of the Mhedai Wildlife Sanctuary include illegal heavy vehicular traffic mismanagement of private lands, illegal mining, tree-felling, monoculture plantations, industrial activities, poaching, and dams and river diversions, notably the Malaprabha Reservoir Project and The Kalasa-Banduri Nala project.

== Mhadei tiger reserve ==
=== Proposal ===
On 20 June 2011, Jairam Ramesh, Minister of State, Ministry of Environment and Forests, advised Digambar Kamat, Chief Minister of Goa, to propose the Mhadei Wildlife Sanctuary as a tiger reserve because of the presence of resident Bengal tigers. The MOEF urged Goa to seriously consider the proposal because Mhadei is a 'contiguous tiger landscape' to Bhimgad Wildlife Sanctuary in Karnataka to its southeast and to Anshi Dandeli Tiger Reserve which has around 35 tigers to its southeast in Karnataka. Ramesh noted that the protected areas of Goa and their contiguous forests in Karnataka and Maharashtra are possibly some of the best tiger habitats in the Western Ghats and are in need of protection. The tiger is a conservation dependent species. He suggested expanding the tiger reserve beyond the existing Mhadei Wildlife Sanctuary.

On 8 August 2011, Goa Forests Minister Filipe Neri Rodrigues questioned the existence of tigers in the state. "It is not my job to know whether there are any tigers here." Rodrigues also said, "the state government would not reply to a directive from former union environment and forests minister minister Jairam Ramesh asking the Goa government to submit a proposal for setting up a tiger reserve, unless specifically asked for. Why should we reply?" It is alleged that the Goa government's sluggishness to acknowledge the presence of tigers in Goa is linked to the state's Rs. 6,500 crore (US$ ~13,000,000.) mining industry, which rings the Western Ghats and most of the tiger terrain near the Mhadei Wildlife Sanctuary.

On 9 August 2011, there was public announcement that "in principle" approval was accorded by the National Tiger Conservation Authority for creation of a new tiger reserve at Mhadei Sanctuary. Under section 38V of the Wildlife Protection Act of 1972 the Goa state government was then authorised to notify Mhadei Wildlife Sanctuary as a tiger reserve.

There is considerable local community support for creation of the tiger reserve which would ensure long term protection of biodiversity-rich areas. In September, 2011, the Save Goa Campaign - UK initiated a petition addressed to The Goa Principal Chief Conservator of Forests, Dr. Shashi Kumar, IFS, in support of Goa's first tiger reserve.

=== Tiger presence ===
The contiguous forests of Goa, Karnataka and Maharashtra including the wildlife sanctuaries of Goa in the Mhadei river valley, the Anshi Tiger Reserve and the reserve forests and wildlife sanctuary of Radhanagari in Karnataka, Chandoli National Park and the reserve forests of Purna and Dodamarg in Maharashtra have been named as Tiger Conservation Units (TCU) numbers 68 to 72, class: II (minimum habitat area to support 50 tigers or documented evidence of 50 tigers) and III (some information on threats and conservation measures is available, but not classified as Class I or II) by WWFInternational.

The Mhadei region lies along the Vagheri hills which means "abode of tiger".

On 24 January 2011 government officials and a senior environmentalist found pugmarks of a tiger adult and a cub near the Anjunem dam, confirming the presence of tiger in the area. Parshuram Kambli, working on the dam first reported the pugmarks. Residents living near the dam supported the claim, stating they have been hearing the tiger roar in the past fortnight. In December 2010, a local resident, Pandurang Gawas, and his son saw a tiger and cub crossing the road that passes alongside the dam. Also in 2011, the Goa Forest Department recorded tiger pug marks in this area during the Goa Wildlife Census conducted with the help of Dehradun-based Wildlife Institute of India (WII).

The 2010 National Tiger Conservation Authority tiger estimation described the Goa stretch of the Western Ghats as an important tiger corridor between Anshi National Park in Karnataka and the Sahyadris in Maharashtra, and confirmed occupancy of Bengal tigers in the state's forests. In October, 2009 poachers were arrested near Mhadei with a tiger carcass and in recent years a live adult female tiger with a cub was sighted in the area. In May 2019, camera traps recorded tigers in this sanctuary and Mollem National Park, the first records in the state since 2013.

== External sources ==
- Centre asks Goa for tiger reserve proposal again 15–8–2012
- Bhimagad forest is now wildlife sanctuary, 12-2-2011
- Map
