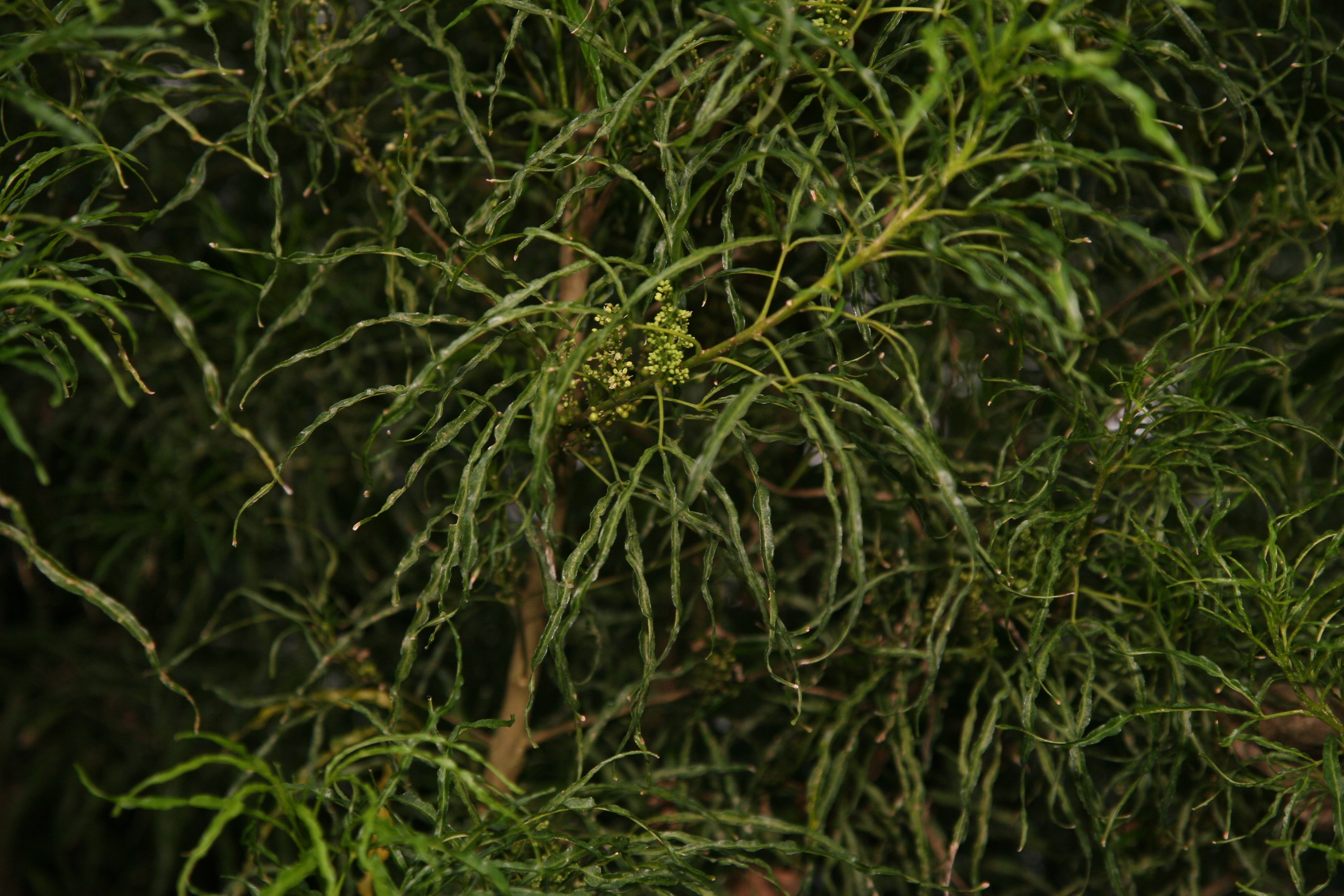
- At Else Kientzler Botanical Garden, Costa Rica

Conservation status
- Least Concern (IUCN 3.1)

Scientific classification
- Kingdom: Plantae
- Clade: Tracheophytes
- Clade: Angiosperms
- Clade: Eudicots
- Clade: Rosids
- Order: Sapindales
- Family: Rutaceae
- Genus: Melicope
- Species: M. denhamii

Binomial name
- Melicope denhamii (Seem.) T.G.Hartley

Synonyms
- List: Aralia quercifolia B.S.Williams; Dizygotheca quercifolia (B.S.Williams) N.Taylor; Euodia quercifolia (B.S.Williams) Ridl.; Evodia albiflora C.T.White; Evodia amboinensis Merr.; Evodia asteridula Merr. & L.M.Perry; Evodia dallmannensis Kurata; Evodia elegans Sander; Evodia gjellerupii Lauterb.; Evodia incisifolia Bakh.f.; Evodia kajewskii Guillaumin; Evodia lamprocarpa K.Schum.; Evodia nitida Lauterb.; Evodia papuana Merr. & L.M.Perry; Evodia ponapensis Kaneh. & Hatus.; Evodia quercifolia (B.S.Williams) Ridl.; Evodia radlkoferiana Lauterb.; Evodia ridleyi Hochr.; Evodia schullei Warb.; Evodia simulans Merr. & L.M.Perry; Evodia subcaudata Merr.; Evodia tenuistyla Stapf; Picrasma denhamii Seem.

= Melicope denhamii =

Species of flowering plant

Melicope denhamii is a plant in the family Rutaceae. It is named for the 19th century Royal Navy captain Henry Mangles Denham.

== Description ==
Melicope denhamii grows up as a shrub or tree up to 25 metres (80 ft) tall. The roundish fruits measure up to 0.3 cm (0.1 in) long.

== Distribution and habitat ==
Melicope denhamii grows naturally from Borneo to the Philippines and south to Fiji. In Sabah its habitat is forests and swamps from sea-level to 950 metres (3,000 ft) altitude.
