= List of capromyids =

Species in mammal family Capromyidae

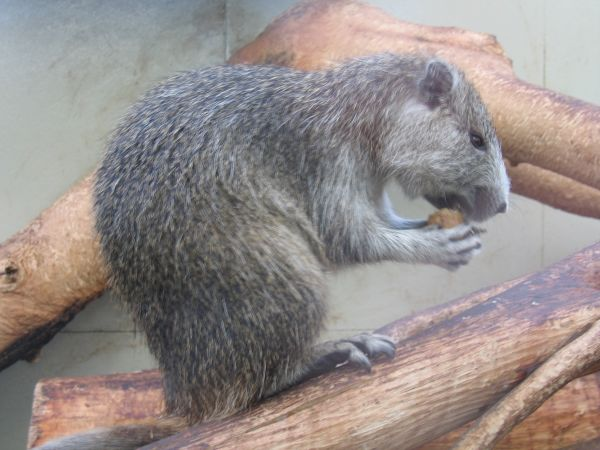
Desmarest's hutia (Capromys pilorides)

Capromyidae is a family of mammals in the order Rodentia and part of the Caviomorpha parvorder. Members of this family are called capromyids or hutias. They are found in the Caribbean on Cuba, Hispaniola, and nearby islands. They live primarily in forests, wetlands, and rocky areas, though some species can be found in shrublands, caves, and coastal areas. They range in size from the dwarf hutia, at 20 cm (8 in) plus a 17 cm (7 in) tail, to Desmarest's hutia, at 62 cm (24 in) plus a 31 cm (12 in) tail. Capromyids are omnivores and eat leaves, fruit, bark, and small animals. Most extant capromyids do not have population estimates, but two species—the Jamaican coney and eared hutia—are categorized as endangered species, and four—the Bahamian hutia, Cabrera's hutia, dwarf hutia, and San Felipe hutia—are categorized as critically endangered with adult populations of 100 or fewer. Eight species, including the subfamilies Hexolobodontinae and Isolobodontinae, were driven extinct after 1500 due to the European colonization of the Americas and introduction of non-native rats, with some species surviving until the 1900s.

The ten extant species of Capromyidae are divided into two subfamilies: Capromyinae, containing nine species in four genera; and Plagiodontinae, with a single species. In addition to the two extinct subfamilies, Capromyinae contains two species and Plagiodontinae three species made extinct since 1500. Capromyidae has been proposed to be merged into the family Echimyidae as the subfamily Capromyinae, with its subfamilies converted to lesser clades, but the proposal is not yet universally accepted. A few extinct prehistoric capromyid species have been discovered, though due to ongoing research and discoveries, the exact number and categorization is not fixed.

== Conventions ==
IUCN Red List categories
Conservation status
- EX: Extinct (8 species)
- EW: Extinct in the wild (0 species)
- CR: Critically endangered (4 species)
- EN: Endangered (2 species)
- VU: Vulnerable (1 species)
- NT: Near threatened (1 species)
- LC: Least concern (2 species)

Other categories
- DD: Data deficient (0 species)
- NE: Not evaluated (0 species)

The author citation for the species or genus is given after the scientific name; parentheses around the author citation indicate that this was not the original taxonomic placement. Conservation status codes listed follow the International Union for Conservation of Nature (IUCN) Red List of Threatened Species. Range maps are provided wherever possible; if a range map is not available, a description of the capromyid's range is provided. Ranges are based on the IUCN Red List for that species unless otherwise noted. All extinct species, subspecies, or genera listed alongside extant species went extinct after 1500 CE, and are indicated by a dagger symbol: "†".

== Classification ==
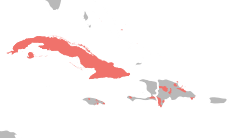
Capromyidae distribution

Capromyidae is a family consisting of ten extant species in five genera. These species are divided into two subfamilies: Capromyinae, containing nine species in four genera, and Plagiodontinae, with a single species. Additionally, the subfamilies Hexolobodontinae, containing a single species, and Isolobodontinae, containing two species in a single genus, as well as two species in Capromyinae and three species in Plagiodontinae, were driven extinct during the modern era due to the European colonization of the Americas, with some species surviving until the 1900s.

- Family Capromyidae
  - Subfamily Capromyinae
    - Genus Capromys (Desmarest's hutia): one species
    - Genus Geocapromys (Bahamian and Jamaican hutias): four species (two extinct)
    - Genus Mesocapromys (Small Cuban hutias): five species
    - Genus Mysateles (prehensile-tailed hutia): one species
  - Subfamily Hexolobodontinae †
    - Genus Hexolobodon † (imposter hutia): one species (one extinct)
  - Subfamily Isolobodontinae †
    - Genus Isolobodon † (laminar-toothed hutias): two species (two extinct)
  - Subfamily Plagiodontinae
    - Genus Hyperplagiodontia † (wide-toothed hutia): one species (one extinct)
    - Genus Plagiodontia (Hispaniolan hutias): two species (one extinct)
    - Genus Rhizoplagiodontia † (Lemke's hutia): one species (one extinct)

- Capromyidae
  - Plagiodontinae
    Plagiodontia
  - Capromyinae
    - Geocapromys
    - - Capromys
      - - Mesocapromys
        - Mysateles

== Capromyids ==
The following classification is based on the taxonomy described by the reference work Mammal Species of the World (2005), with augmentation by generally accepted proposals made since using molecular phylogenetic analysis, as supported by both the IUCN and the American Society of Mammalogists.

=== Subfamily Capromyinae ===
Genus Capromys – Desmarest, 1822 – one species
Common name	Scientific name and subspecies	Range	Size and ecology	IUCN status and estimated population
Desmarest's hutia	C. pilorides Say, 1822 Three subspecies: C. p. doceleguas; C. p. pilorides; C. p. relictus	Cuba	Size: 30–62 cm (12–24 in) long, plus 13–31 cm (5–12 in) tail Habitat: Forest and caves Diet: Leaves, fruit, bark, lizards, and other small animals	LC Unknown

Genus Geocapromys – Chapman, 1901 – four species
Common name	Scientific name and subspecies	Range	Size and ecology	IUCN status and estimated population
Bahamian hutia	G. ingrahami (J. A. Allen, 1891)	The Bahamas	Size: 28–32 cm (11–13 in) long, plus about 6 cm (2 in) tail Habitat: Forest, shrubland, rocky areas, and intertidal marine Diet: Bark, twigs, and leaves	CR Unknown
Cuban coney †	G. columbianus (Chapman, 1892)	Cuba	Size: Unknown Habitat: Unknown Diet: Bark, twigs, and leaves	EX 0
Jamaican coney	G. brownii (J. B. Fischer, 1829)	Jamaica	Size: 37–45 cm (15–18 in) long, plus 4–7 cm (2–3 in) tail Habitat: Forest and rocky areas Diet: Bark, twigs, and leaves	EN Unknown
Little Swan Island hutia †	G. thoracatus (True, 1888)	Little Swan Island, Honduras	Size: Unknown Habitat: Shrubland Diet: Bark, twigs, and leaves	EX 0

Genus Mesocapromys – Varona, 1970 – five species
Common name	Scientific name and subspecies	Range	Size and ecology	IUCN status and estimated population
Black-tailed hutia	M. melanurus (Poey, 1865)	Southeastern Cuba	Size: 31–38 cm (12–15 in) long, plus 21–32 cm (8–13 in) tail Habitat: Forest Diet: Vegetation and small animals	VU Unknown
Cabrera's hutia	M. angelcabrerai (Varona, 1979)	Western Cuba	Size: About 25 cm (10 in) long, plus about 18 cm (7 in) tail Habitat: Forest and inland wetlands Diet: Vegetation and small animals	CR Unknown
Dwarf hutia	M. nanus (Allen, 1917)	Western Cuba	Size: About 20 cm (8 in) long, plus about 17 cm (7 in) tail Habitat: Inland wetlands Diet: Vegetation and small animals	CR 0–50
Eared hutia	M. auritus (Varona, 1970)	Island of Cayo Fragoso, north of Cuba	Size: About 29 cm (11 in) long, plus about 20 cm (8 in) tail Habitat: Forest and inland wetlands Diet: Vegetation and small animals	EN 600–1,300
San Felipe hutia	M. sanfelipensis (Varona & Garrido, 1970)	Island of Cayo de Juan Garcia, southwest of Cuba	Size: Unknown Habitat: Inland wetlands Diet: Vegetation and small animals	CR 0–100

Genus Mysateles – Lesson, 1842 – one species
Common name	Scientific name and subspecies	Range	Size and ecology	IUCN status and estimated population
Prehensile-tailed hutia	M. prehensilis (Poeppig, 1824) Two subspecies: M. p. gundlachi; M. p. prehensilis	Western Cuba	Size: 33–45 cm (13–18 in) long, plus 25–35 cm (10–14 in) tail Habitat: Forest Diet: Leaves	NT Unknown

=== Subfamily Hexolobodontinae ===
Genus Hexolobodon † – Miller, 1929 – one species
Common name	Scientific name and subspecies	Range	Size and ecology	IUCN status and estimated population
Imposter hutia †	H. phenax Miller, 1929	Hispaniola	Size: Unknown Habitat: Unknown Diet: Unknown	EX 0

=== Subfamily Isolobodontinae ===
Genus Isolobodon † – J. A. Allen, 1916 – two species
Common name	Scientific name and subspecies	Range	Size and ecology	IUCN status and estimated population
Montane hutia †	I. montanus (Miller, 1922)	Hispaniola	Size: Unknown Habitat: Forest Diet: Unknown	EX 0
Puerto Rican hutia †	I. portoricensis J. A. Allen, 1916	Hispaniola, Puerto Rico, and nearby islands	Size: Unknown Habitat: Unknown Diet: Unknown	EX 0

=== Subfamily Plagiodontinae ===
Genus Hyperplagiodontia † – Rímoli, 1977 – one species
Common name	Scientific name and subspecies	Range	Size and ecology	IUCN status and estimated population
Wide-toothed hutia †	H. araeum Ray, 1964	Hispaniola	Size: Unknown Habitat: Unknown Diet: Bark, leaves, and tree buds	EX 0

Genus Plagiodontia – F. Cuvier, 1836 – two species
Common name	Scientific name and subspecies	Range	Size and ecology	IUCN status and estimated population
Hispaniolan hutia	P. aedium (F. Cuvier, 1836) Two subspecies: P. a. aedium; P. a. hylaeum	Hispaniola	Size: 31–40 cm (12–16 in) long, plus 12–16 cm (5–6 in) tail Habitat: Forest and rocky areas Diet: Bark, leaves, and tree buds	LC Unknown
Samaná hutia †	P. ipnaeum Johnson, 1948	Hispaniola	Size: Unknown Habitat: Unknown Diet: Bark, leaves, and tree buds	EX 0

Genus Rhizoplagiodontia † – Woods, 1989 – one species
Common name	Scientific name and subspecies	Range	Size and ecology	IUCN status and estimated population
Lemke's hutia †	R. lemkei Woods, 1989	Hispaniola	Size: Unknown Habitat: Unknown Diet: Unknown	EX 0

== Sources ==
- Chernasky, Amy; Motis, Anna; Burgin, Connor, eds. (2023). All the Mammals of the World. Lynx Nature Books. ISBN 978-84-16728-66-4.
- Nowak, Ronald M. (1999). Walker's Mammals of the World. Vol. 2 (6th ed.). Johns Hopkins University Press. ISBN 978-0-8018-5789-8.
- Upham, Nathan S.; Patterson, Bruce D. (2015). Vassallo, A. I.; Antenucci, D. (eds.). Biology of Caviomorph Rodents: Diversity and Evolution. Sociedad Argentina para el Estudio de los Mamíferos Series A Mammalogical Research. ISBN 978-987-98497-3-6.
- Woods, Charles A.; Kilpatrick, C. William (2005). Wilson, Don E.; Reeder, DeeAnn M. (eds.). Mammal Species of the World. Vol. 2 (3rd ed.). Johns Hopkins University Press. ISBN 978-0-8018-8221-0.
