= List of mammals of the Dominican Republic =

This is a list of the mammal species recorded in the Dominican Republic. Of the mammal species in the Dominican Republic, one is critically endangered, one is endangered, three are vulnerable, and ten are considered to be extinct.

The following tags are used to highlight each species' conservation status as assessed by the International Union for Conservation of Nature:

EX	Extinct	No reasonable doubt that the last individual has died.
EW	Extinct in the wild	Known only to survive in captivity or as a naturalized populations well outside its previous range.
CR	Critically endangered	The species is in imminent risk of extinction in the wild.
EN	Endangered	The species is facing an extremely high risk of extinction in the wild.
VU	Vulnerable	The species is facing a high risk of extinction in the wild.
NT	Near threatened	The species does not meet any of the criteria that would categorise it as risking extinction but it is likely to do so in the future.
LC	Least concern	There are no current identifiable risks to the species.
DD	Data deficient	There is inadequate information to make an assessment of the risks to this species.

== Order: Sirenia (manatees and dugongs) ==
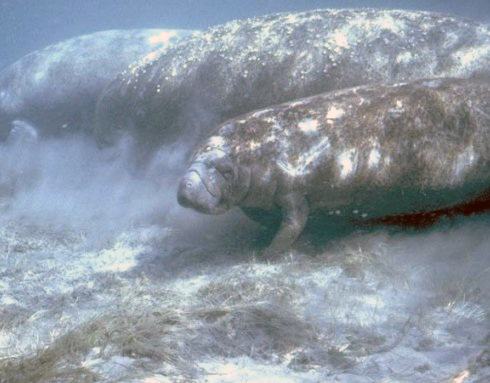
West Indian manatee

Sirenia is an order of fully aquatic, herbivorous mammals that inhabit rivers, estuaries, coastal marine waters, swamps, and marine wetlands. All four species are threatened.

- Family: Trichechidae
  - Genus: Trichechus
    - West Indian manatee, T. manatus VU

== Order: Rodentia (rodents) ==
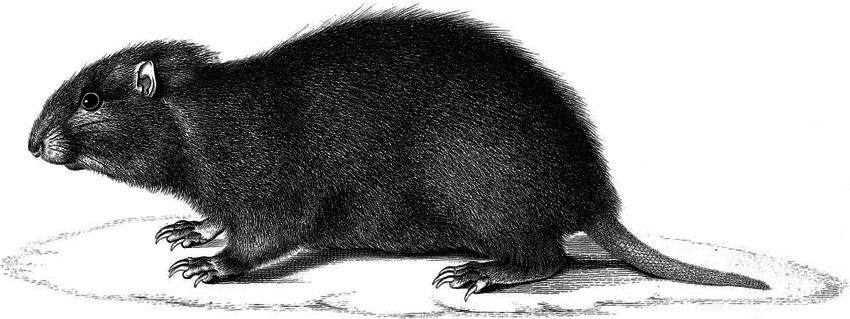
Hispaniolan hutia

Rodents make up the largest order of mammals, with over 40% of mammalian species. They have two incisors in the upper and lower jaw which grow continually and must be kept short by gnawing. Most rodents are small though the capybara can weigh up to 45 kg (99 lb).

- Suborder: Hystricomorpha
  - Family: Capromyidae
    - Tribe: Plagiodontini
      - Genus: Plagiodontia
        - Hispaniolan hutia, P. aedium EN
- Suborder: Muridae
  - Family: Muridae
    - Genus: Rattus
      - Brown rat, R. norvegicus LC introduced
      - Black rat, R. rattus LC introduced
    - Genus: Mus
      - House mouse, M. musculus LC introduced

== Order: Eulipotyphla (shrews, hedgehogs, moles, and solenodons) ==
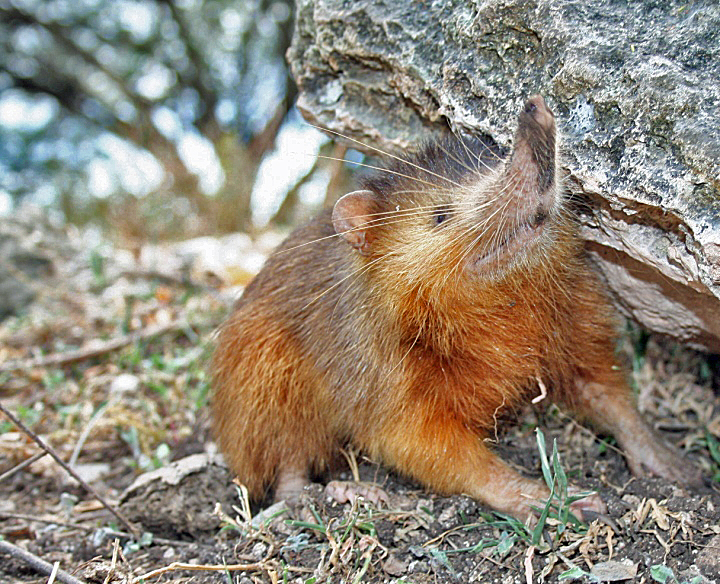
Hispaniolan solenodon

Eulipotyphlans are insectivorous mammals. Shrews and solenodons closely resemble mice, hedgehogs carry spines, while moles are stout-bodied burrowers.

- Family: Solenodontidae
  - Genus: Solenodon
    - Hispaniolan solenodon, S. paradoxus LC

== Order: lagomorpha (rabbits and hares) ==
Lagomorphs can be distinguish by their long ears.

- Family: Leporidae
  - Genus: Oryctolagus
    - European rabbit, O. cuniculus introduced

== Order: Chiroptera (bats) ==
Big brown bat

Greater fishing bat

Velvety free-tailed bat

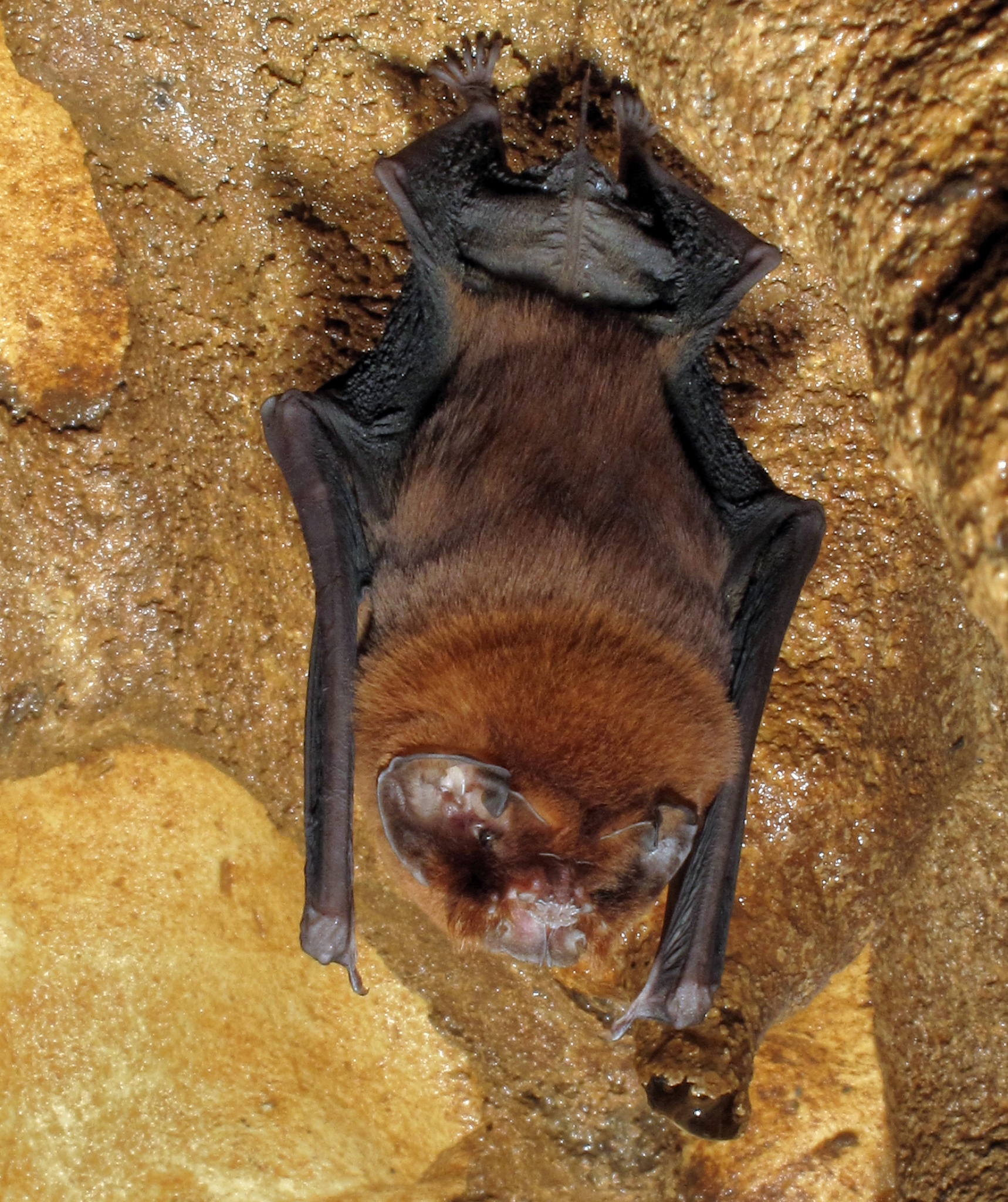
Antillean ghost faced bat

Jamaican fruit bat

The bats' most distinguishing feature is that their forelimbs are developed as wings, making them the only mammals capable of flight. Bat species account for about 20% of all mammals.

- Family: Vespertilionidae
  - Genus: Eptesicus
    - Big brown bat, E. fuscus LC
  - Genus: Lasiurus
    - Minor red bat, L. minor VU
- Family: Noctilionidae
  - Genus: Noctilio
    - Greater bulldog bat, N. leporinus LC
- Family: Molossidae
  - Genus: Molossus
    - Velvety free-tailed bat, M. molossus LC
  - Genus: Nyctinomops
    - Big free-tailed bat, N. macrotis LC
  - Genus: Tadarida
    - Mexican free-tailed bat, T. brasiliensis LC
- Family: Mormoopidae
  - Genus: Mormoops
    - Antillean ghost-faced bat, M. blainvillei NT
  - Genus: Pteronotus
    - Parnell's mustached bat, P. parnellii NT
    - Sooty mustached bat, P. quadridens NT
- Family: Phyllostomidae
  - Subfamily: Phyllostominae
    - Genus: Macrotus
      - Waterhouse's leaf-nosed bat, M. waterhousii LC
    - Genus: Erophylla
      - Brown flower bat, E. bombifrons LC
  - Subfamily: Brachyphyllinae
    - Genus: Brachyphylla
      - Cuban fruit-eating bat, B. nana NT
  - Subfamily: Phyllonycterinae
    - Genus: Phyllonycteris
      - Cuban flower bat, P. poeyi NT
  - Subfamily: Glossophaginae
    - Genus: Monophyllus
      - Leach's single leaf bat, M. redmani LC
  - Subfamily: Stenodermatinae
    - Genus: Artibeus
      - Jamaican fruit bat, A. jamaicensis LC
    - Genus: Phyllops
      - Cuban fig-eating bat, P. falcatus NT
- Family: Natalidae
  - Genus: Chilonatalus
    - Cuban funnel-eared bat, C. micropus VU
  - Genus: Natalus
    - Hispaniolan greater funnel-eared bat, N. major NT

== Order: Cetacea (whales) ==
Humpback whale

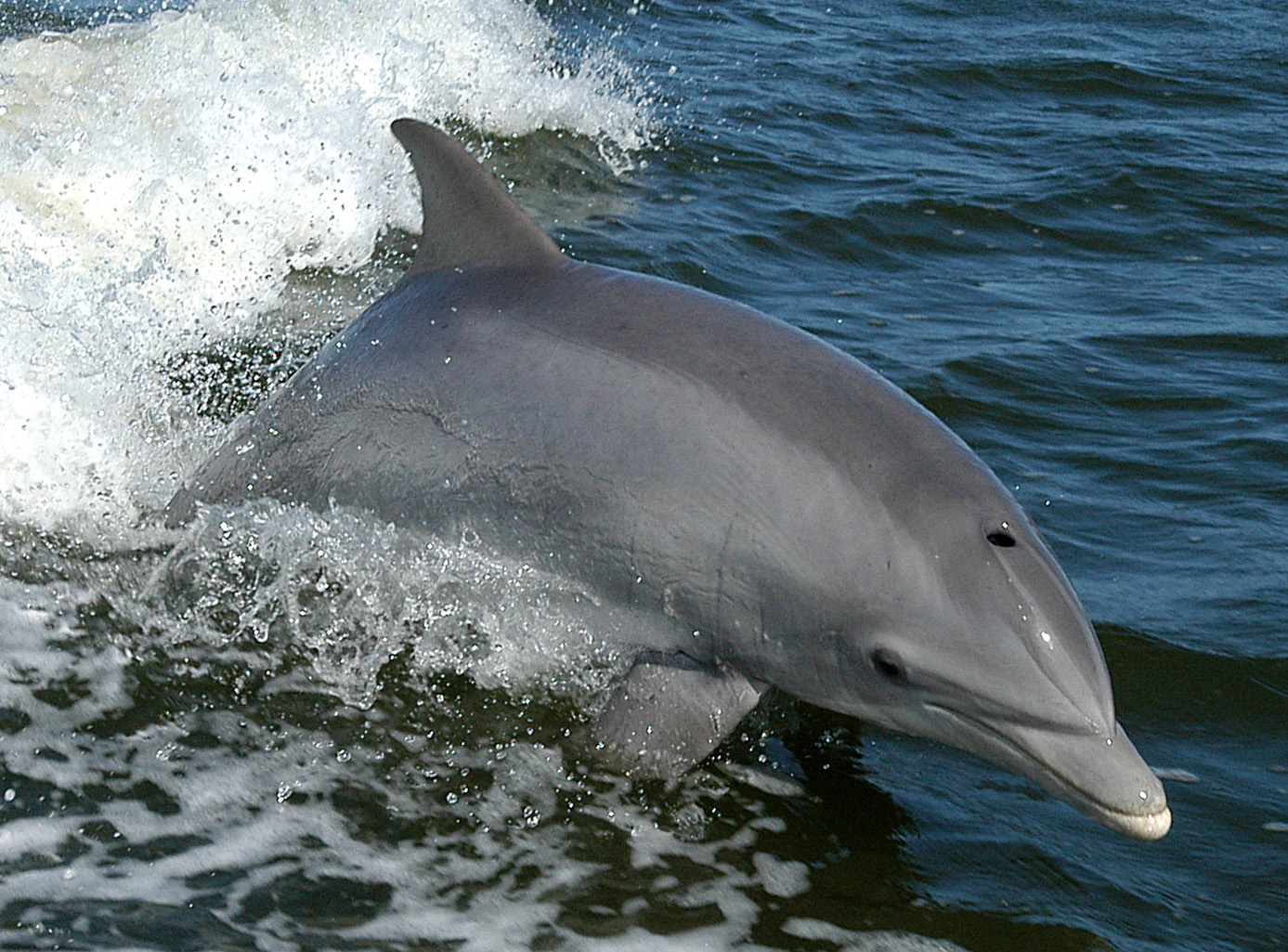
Common bottlenose dolphin

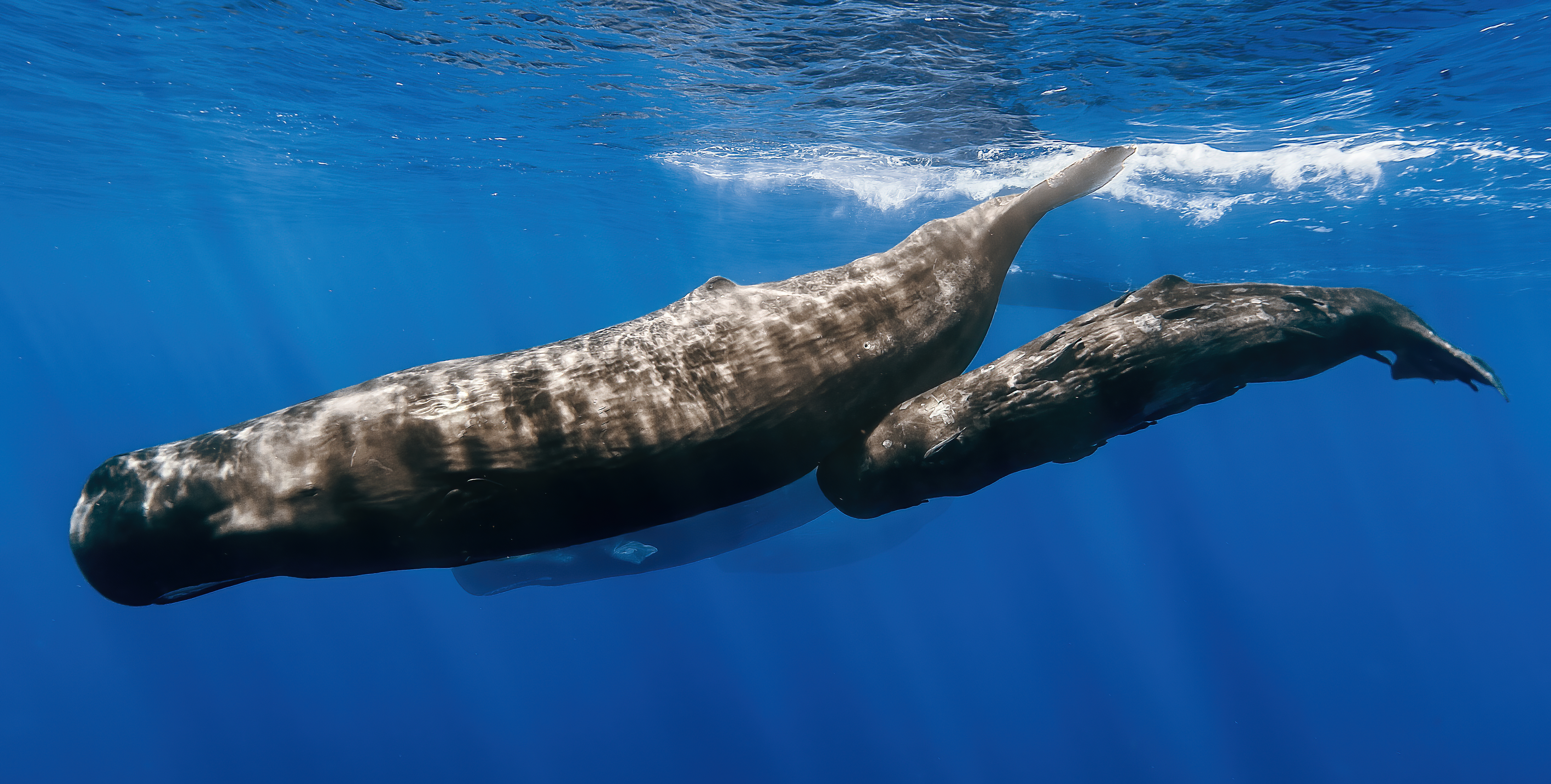
Sperm whale

The order Cetacea includes whales, dolphins and porpoises. They are the mammals most fully adapted to aquatic life with a spindle-shaped nearly hairless body, protected by a thick layer of blubber, and forelimbs and tail modified to provide propulsion underwater.

- Suborder: Mysticeti
  - Family: Balaenopteridae (baleen whales)
    - Genus: Balaenoptera
      - Common minke whale, B. acutorostrata LC
      - Sei whale, B. borealis EN
      - Bryde's whale, B. brydei LC
      - Blue whale, B. musculus EN
      - Fin whale, B. physalus VU
    - Genus: Megaptera
      - Humpback whale, M. novaeangliae LC
- Suborder: Odontoceti
  - Superfamily: Platanistoidea
    - Family: Delphinidae (marine dolphins)
      - Genus: Delphinus
        - Short-beaked common dolphin, D. delphis DD
      - Genus: Feresa
        - Pygmy killer whale, F. attenuata DD
      - Genus: Globicephala
        - Short-finned pilot whale, G. macrorhyncus DD
      - Genus: Grampus
        - Risso's dolphin, G. griseus DD
      - Genus: Lagenodelphis
        - Fraser's dolphin, L. hosei DD
      - Genus: Orcinus
        - Killer whale, O. orca DD
      - Genus: Peponocephala
        - Melon-headed whale, P. electra DD
      - Genus: Pseudorca
        - False killer whale, P. crassidens DD
      - Genus: Stenella
        - Pantropical spotted dolphin, S. attenuata DD
        - Clymene dolphin, S. clymene DD
        - Striped dolphin, S. coeruleoalba DD
        - Atlantic spotted dolphin, S. frontalis DD
        - Spinner dolphin, S. longirostris DD
      - Genus: Steno
        - Rough-toothed dolphin, S. bredanensis DD
      - Genus: Tursiops
        - Common bottlenose dolphin, T. truncatus
    - Family: Physeteridae (sperm whales)
      - Genus: Physeter
        - Sperm whale, P. macrocephalus VU
    - Family: Kogiidae (dwarf sperm whales)
      - Genus: Kogia
        - Pygmy sperm whale, K. breviceps DD
        - Dwarf sperm whale, K. sima DD
  - Superfamily Ziphioidea
    - Family: Ziphidae (beaked whales)
      - Genus: Mesoplodon
        - Blainville's beaked whale, M. densirostris DD
        - Gervais' beaked whale, M. europaeus DD
      - Genus: Ziphius
        - Cuvier's beaked whale, Z. cavirostris DD

== Order: Carnivora (carnivorans) ==
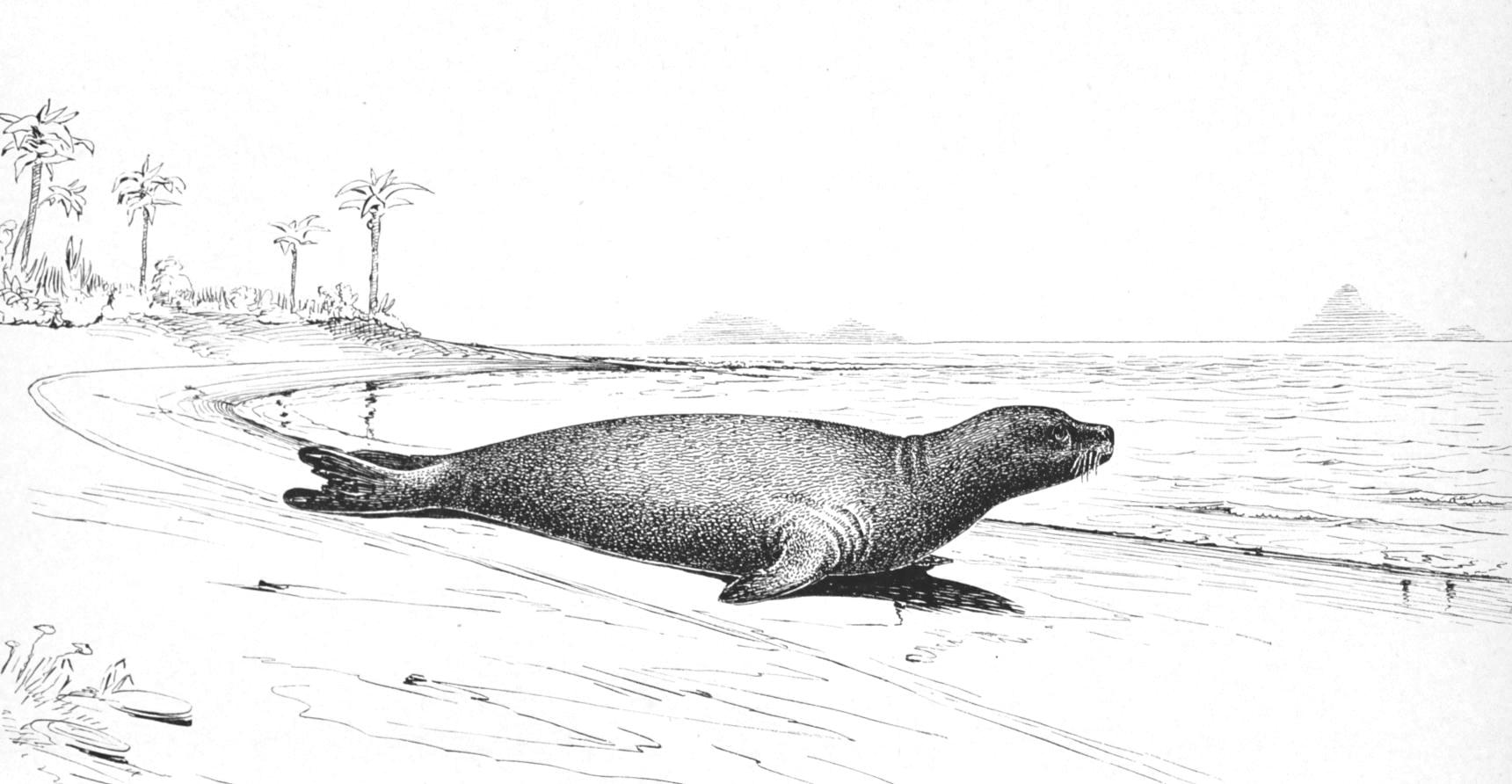
Caribbean monk seal

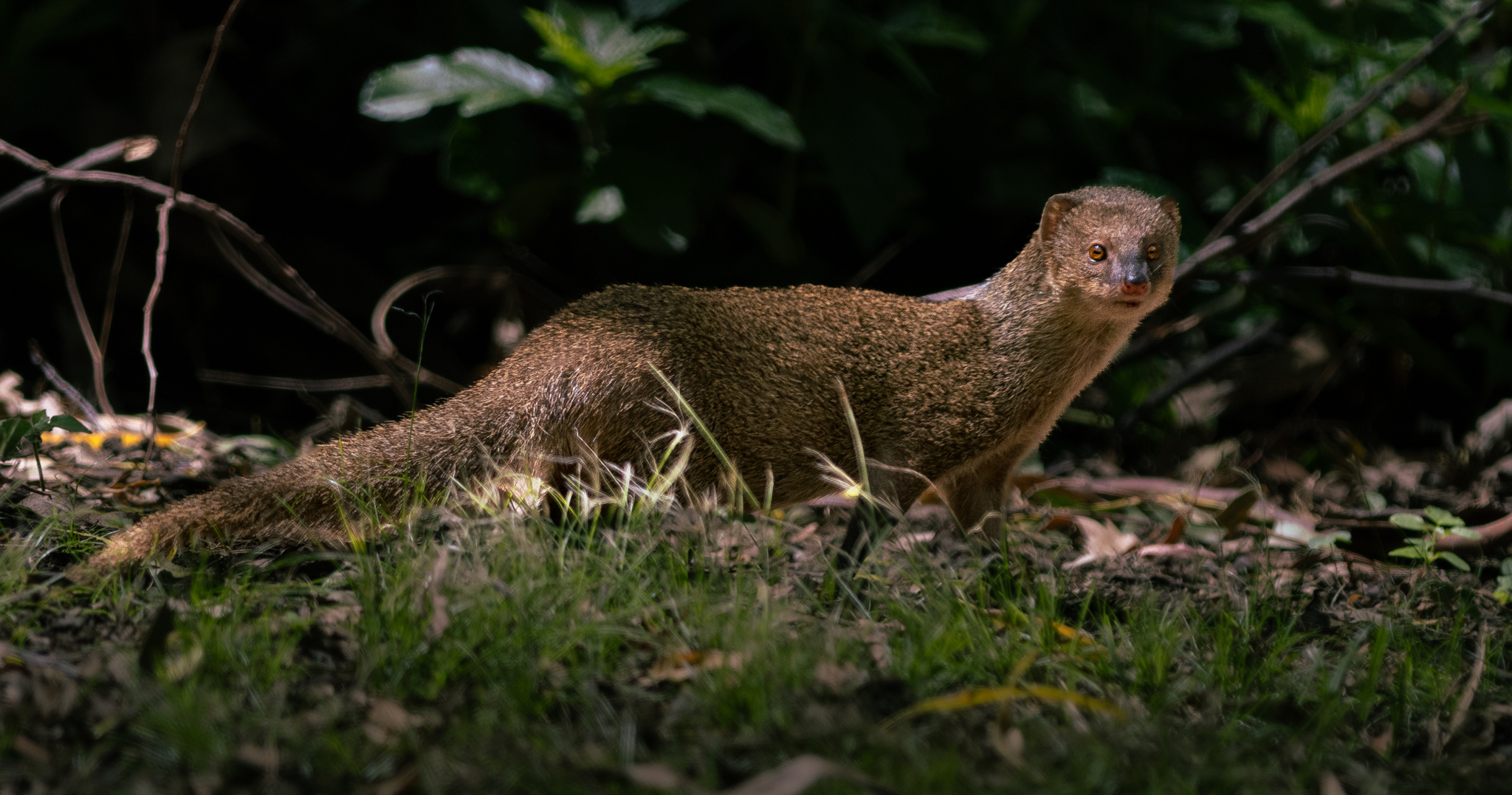
Small indian mongoose

There are over 260 species of carnivorans, the majority of which feed primarily on meat. They have a characteristic skull shape and dentition.

- Family: Canidae
  - Genus: Canis
    - Feral dog, C. familiaris NE introduced
- Family: Procyonidae
  - Genus: Procyon
    - Common raccoon, P. lotor LC introduced to Isla Catalina. Possibly native but extirpatated from the mainland possibly since 1513
- Family: Phocidae
  - Genus Cystophora
    - Hooded seal, C. cristata VU occasional visitor
  - Genus: Neomonachus
    - Caribbean monk seal, N. tropicalis EX
- Family: Felidae
  - Genus: Felis
    - Feral cat, F. catus NE introduced
- Family: Herpestidae
  - Genus: Urva
    - Small Indian mongoose, U. auropunctata LC introduced

== Order: Perissodactyla (odd-toed ungulates) ==
Odd-toed ungulates are herbivorous, hoofed mammals distinguished by an odd number of toes on each foot. They bear the majority of their weight on the middle (third) digit. Today, this group is represented by only three living families: horses (one toe), rhinoceroses (three toes), and tapirs (four toes in front, three in back).

- Family: Equidae
  - Genus: Equus
    - Feral donkey, E. asinus NE introduced (extirpated in 2017)

== Order: Artiodactyla (even-toed ungulates) ==
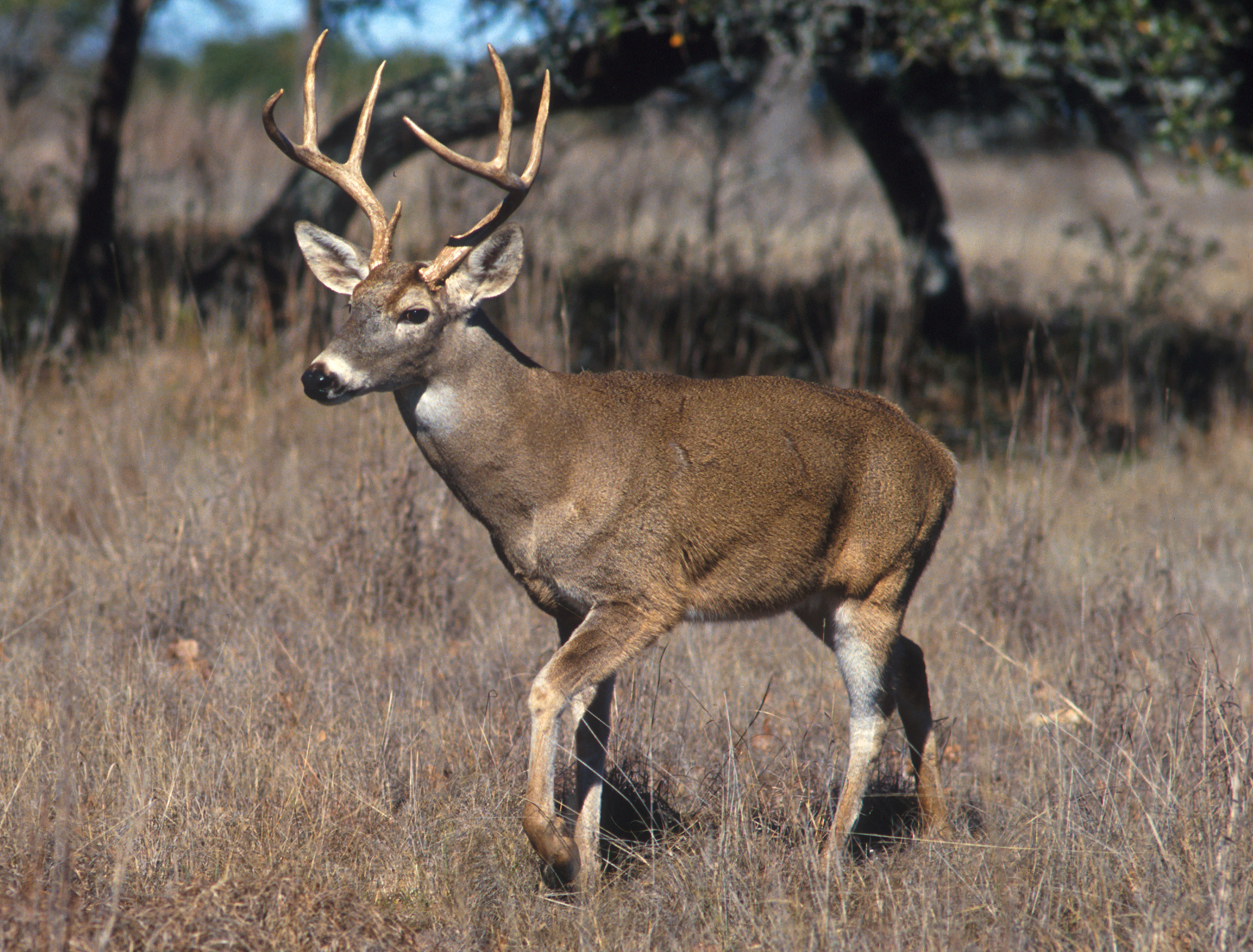
White-tailed deer

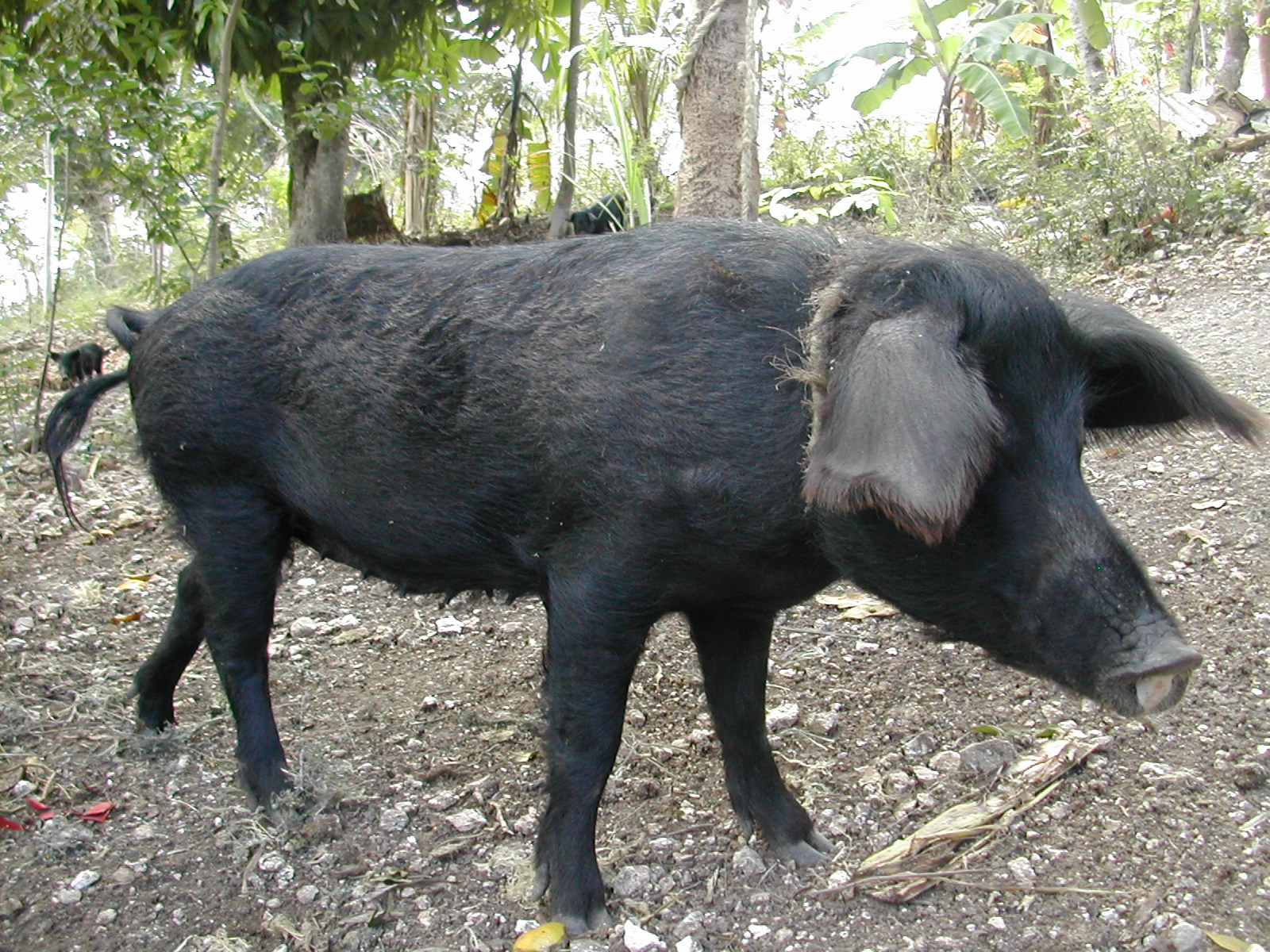
Wild boar

The even-toed ungulates are ungulates – hoofed animals – which bear weight equally on two (an even number) of their five toes: the third and fourth. The other three toes are either present, absent, vestigial, or pointing posteriorly.

- Family: Cervidae
  - Subfamily: Capreolinae
    - Genus: Odocoileus
      - White-tailed deer, O. virginianus LC introduced
- Family Suidae (pigs)
  - Genus: Sus
    - Wild boar, S. scrofa LC introduced
- Family Bovidae (bovines)
  - Genus: Bos
    - Feral cattle, B. taurus NE introduced (multiple introductions, all ended in extirpation. The first started in the 1600s and ended in the early 20th century. The second introduction happened at Valle Nuevo in the mid-1930s and ended in late 2023. The third introduction happened in late 2004 and were extirpated in 2017.)
  - Genus: Capra
    - Feral goat, C. hircus NE introduced

Status: Extant

== Pre-Columbian extinctions ==
The following species went extinct before or a few years after human arrival

- Hispaniolan edible rat, Brotomys voratus EX 1670
- Wide-toothed hutia, Hyperplagiodontia araeum EX 1500s
- Samaná hutia, Plagiodontia ipnaeum EX 1600s
- Small Haitian hutia, Plagiodontia spelaeum EX 1500s
- Lemke's hutia, Rhizoplagiodontia lemkei EX 1500s
- Montane hutia, Isolobodon montanus EX 1600s
- Puerto Rican hutia, Isolobodon portoricensis EX 1600s
- Imposter hutia, Hexolobodon phenax EX 1500s
- Twisted-toothed mouse, Quemisia gravis EX 1500s
- Atalaye nesophontes, Nesophontes hypomicrus EX 1600s
- Western Cuban nesophontes, Nesophontes micrus EX 1650
- St. Michel nesophontes, Nesophontes paramicrus EX 1500s
- Haitian nesophontes, Nesophontes zamicrus EX 1500s
- Marcano's solenodon, Solenodon marcanoi EX 1500s
- Hispaniola monkey, Antillothrix bernensis EX 1600s
- Large Hispaniolan sloth, Megalocnus ziliz EX 1000 BC
- Dominican flat-nosed sloth, Acratocnus simorhynchus EX 1000 BC
- Haitian giant sloth, Parocnus dominicanus EX 1000 BC
- Curved-tooth sloth, Parocnus serus EX 1000 BC
- Antillean tree sloth, Neocnus comes EX 1000 BC
- Major's tree sloth, Neocnus dousmanis EX 1000 BC

== See also ==
- List of chordate orders
- Lists of mammals by region
- Mammal classification
