= List of mammals of Haiti =

This is a list of the mammal species recorded in Haiti. Of the mammal species in Haiti, one is critically endangered, one is endangered, two are vulnerable, and sixteen are considered to be extinct.

The following tags are used to highlight each species' conservation status as assessed by the International Union for Conservation of Nature:

EX	Extinct	No reasonable doubt that the last individual has died.
EW	Extinct in the wild	Known only to survive in captivity or as a naturalized populations well outside its previous range.
CR	Critically endangered	The species is in imminent risk of extinction in the wild.
EN	Endangered	The species is facing an extremely high risk of extinction in the wild.
VU	Vulnerable	The species is facing a high risk of extinction in the wild.
NT	Near threatened	The species does not meet any of the criteria that would categorise it as risking extinction but it is likely to do so in the future.
LC	Least concern	There are no current identifiable risks to the species.
DD	Data deficient	There is inadequate information to make an assessment of the risks to this species.

== Order: Sirenia (manatees and dugongs) ==
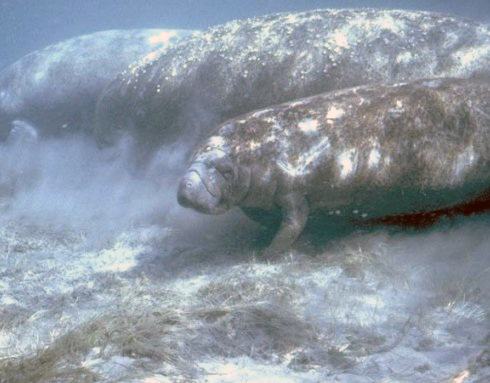
West Indian manatees

Sirenia is an order of fully aquatic, herbivorous mammals that inhabit rivers, estuaries, coastal marine waters, swamps, and marine wetlands. All four species are endangered.

- Family: Trichechidae
  - Genus: Trichechus
    - West Indian manatee, T. manatus VU presence uncertain

== Order: Rodentia (rodents) ==
Rodents make up the largest order of mammals, with over 40% of mammalian species. They have two incisors in the upper and lower jaw which grow continually and must be kept short by gnawing. Most rodents are small though the capybara can weigh up to 45 kg (99 lb).

- Suborder: Hystricognathi
  - Family: Capromyidae
    - Tribe: Plagiodontini
      - Genus: Plagiodontia
        - Hispaniolan hutia, Plagiodontia aedium LC

== Order: Eulipotyphla (shrews, hedgehogs, moles, and solenodons) ==
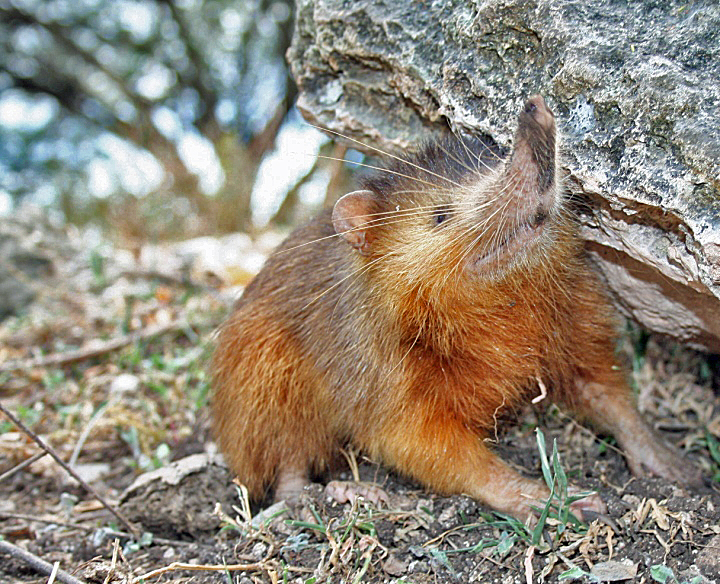
Hispaniolan solenodon

Eulipotyphlans are insectivorous mammals. Shrews and solenodons closely resemble mice, hedgehogs carry spines, while moles are stout-bodied burrowers.

- Family: Solenodontidae
  - Genus: Solenodon
    - Hispaniolan solenodon, S. paradoxus LC

== Order: Chiroptera (bats) ==
The bats' most distinguishing feature is that their forelimbs are developed as wings, making them the only mammals capable of flight. Bat species account for about 20% of all mammals.

- Family: Noctilionidae
  - Genus: Noctilio
    - Greater bulldog bat, Noctilio leporinus LC
- Family: Vespertilionidae
  - Subfamily: Vespertilioninae
    - Genus: Lasiurus
      - Minor red bat, Lasiurus minor VU
- Family: Molossidae
  - Genus: Molossus
    - Velvety free-tailed bat, Molossus molossus LC
  - Genus: Nyctinomops
    - Big free-tailed bat, Nyctinomops macrotis LC
  - Genus: Tadarida
    - Mexican free-tailed bat, Tadarida brasiliensis LC
- Family: Mormoopidae
  - Genus: Mormoops
    - Antillean ghost-faced bat, Mormoops blainvillii LC
  - Genus: Pteronotus
    - Parnell's mustached bat, Pteronotus parnellii LC
    - Sooty mustached bat, Pteronotus quadridens LC
- Family: Phyllostomidae
  - Subfamily: Phyllostominae
    - Genus: Macrotus
      - Waterhouse's leaf-nosed bat, Macrotus waterhousii LC
  - Subfamily: Brachyphyllinae
    - Genus: Brachyphylla
      - Cuban fruit-eating bat, Brachyphylla nana LC
  - Subfamily: Phyllonycterinae
    - Genus: Phyllonycteris
      - Cuban flower bat, Phyllonycteris poeyi LC
  - Subfamily: Glossophaginae
    - Genus: Monophyllus
      - Leach's single leaf bat, Monophyllus redmani LC
  - Subfamily: Stenodermatinae
    - Genus: Artibeus
      - Jamaican fruit bat, Artibeus jamaicensis LC
    - Genus: Phyllops
      - Cuban fig-eating bat, Phyllops falcatus LC
- Family: Natalidae
  - Genus: Chilonatalus
    - Cuban funnel-eared bat, Chilonatalus micropus VU

== Order: Cetacea (whales) ==
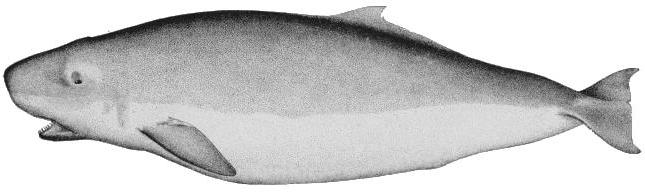
Pygmy sperm whale

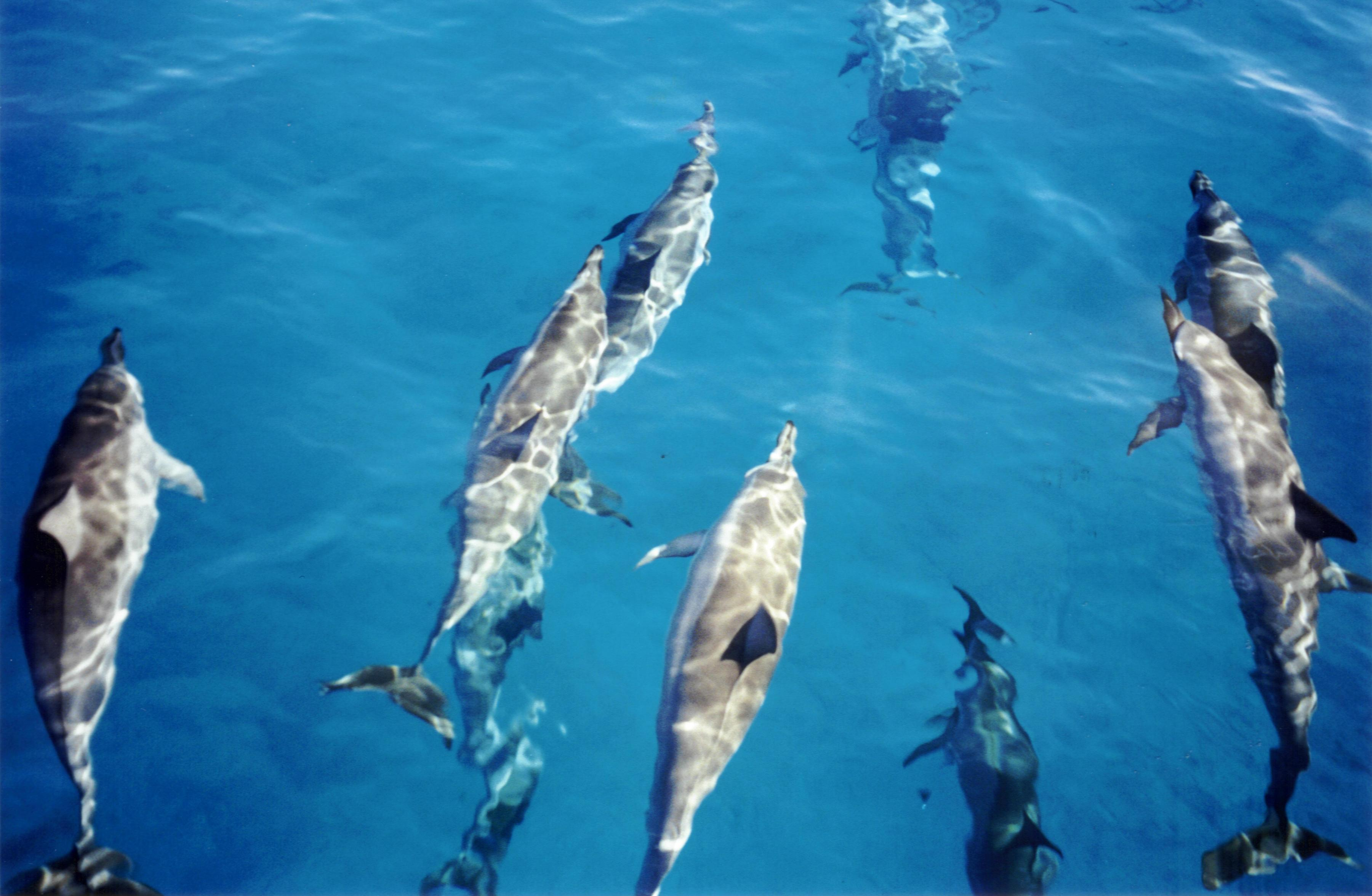
Spinner dolphins

The order Cetacea includes whales, dolphins and porpoises. They are the mammals most fully adapted to aquatic life with a spindle-shaped nearly hairless body, protected by a thick layer of blubber, and forelimbs and tail modified to provide propulsion underwater.

- Suborder: Mysticeti
  - Family: Balaenopteridae (baleen whales)
    - Genus: Balaenoptera
      - Common minke whale, Balaenoptera acutorostrata LC
      - Sei whale, Balaenoptera borealis EN
      - Bryde's whale, Balaenoptera brydei DD
      - Blue whale, Balaenoptera musculus EN
    - Genus: Megaptera
      - Humpback whale, Megaptera novaeangliae LC
- Suborder: Odontoceti
  - Superfamily: Platanistoidea
    - Family: Delphinidae (marine dolphins)
      - Genus: Delphinus
        - Short-beaked common dolphin, Delphinus delphis LC
      - Genus: Feresa
        - Pygmy killer whale, Feresa attenuata LC
      - Genus: Globicephala
        - Short-finned pilot whale, Globicephala macrorhyncus LC
      - Genus: Lagenodelphis
        - Fraser's dolphin, Lagenodelphis hosei LC
      - Genus: Grampus
        - Risso's dolphin, Grampus griseus LC
      - Genus: Orcinus
        - Killer whale, Orcinus orca DD
      - Genus: Peponocephala
        - Melon-headed whale, Peponocephala electra LC
      - Genus: Pseudorca
        - False killer whale, Pseudorca crassidens NT
      - Genus: Stenella
        - Pantropical spotted dolphin, Stenella attenuata LC
        - Clymene dolphin, Stenella clymene LC
        - Striped dolphin, Stenella coeruleoalba LC
        - Atlantic spotted dolphin, Stenella frontalis LC
        - Spinner dolphin, Stenella longirostris LC
      - Genus: Steno
        - Rough-toothed dolphin, Steno bredanensis LC
      - Genus: Tursiops
        - Common bottlenose dolphin, Tursiops truncatus LC
    - Family: Physeteridae (sperm whales)
      - Genus: Physeter
        - Sperm whale, Physeter macrocaphalus VU
    - Family: Kogiidae (dwarf sperm whales)
      - Genus: Kogia
        - Pygmy sperm whale, Kogia breviceps LC
        - Dwarf sperm whale, Kogia sima LC
  - Superfamily Ziphioidea
    - Family: Ziphidae (beaked whales)
      - Genus: Mesoplodon
        - Gervais' beaked whale, Mesoplodon europaeus LC
        - Blainville's beaked whale, Mesplodon densirostris LC
      - Genus: Ziphius
        - Cuvier's beaked whale, Ziphius cavirostris LC

== Order: Carnivora (carnivorans) ==
There are over 260 species of carnivorans, the majority of which feed primarily on meat. They have a characteristic skull shape and dentition.

- Family: Canidae
  - Genus: Canis
    - Feral dog, C. familiaris NE introduced
- Family: Procyonidae
  - Genus: Procyon
    - Common raccoon, P. lotor LC Possibly native but extirpatated from the island possibly since 1513
- Family: Felidae
  - Genus: Felis
    - Feral cat, F. catus NE introduced
- Family: Phocidae
  - Genus: Neomonachus
    - Caribbean monk seal, N. tropicalis EX
  - Genus Cystophora
    - Hooded seal, C. cristata EN occasional visitor
- Family: Herpestidae
  - Genus: Urva
    - Small Indian mongoose, U. auropunctata LC

== Order: Artiodactyla (even-toed ungulates) ==
The even-toed ungulates are ungulates – hoofed animals – which bear weight equally on two (an even number) of their five toes: the third and fourth. The other three toes are either present, absent, vestigial, or pointing posteriorly.

- Family Suidae (pigs)
  - Genus: Sus
    - Wild boar, S. scrofa LC introduced
- Family Bovidae (Bovines)
  - Genus: Capra
    - Feral goat, C. hircus NE introduced

Status: extant

== Pre-Columbian extinct ==
The following species went extinct before and a few years after European arrival:

- Wide-toothed hutia, Hyperplagiodontia araeum EX 500 AC
- Samaná hutia, Plagiodontia ipnaeum EX 1600s
- Small Haitian hutia, Plagiodontia spelaeum EX 1500s
- Lemke's hutia, Rhizoplagiodontia lemkei EX 1500s
- Montane hutia, Isolobodon montanus EX 1600s
- Puerto Rican hutia, Isolobodon portoricensis EX 1600s
- Imposter hutia, Hexolobodon phenax EX 1500s
- Twisted-toothed mouse, Quemisia gravis EX 1500s
- Atalaye nesophontes, Nesophontes hypomicrus EX 1600s
- Western Cuban nesophontes, Nesophontes micrus EX 1650
- St. Michel nesophontes, Nesophontes paramicrus EX 1500s
- Haitian nesophontes, Nesophontes zamicrus EX 1500s
- Marcano's solenodon, Solenodon marcanoi EX 1500s
- Haitian Macaya sloth, Acratocnus ye EX 1500 BC
- Lesser Haitian ground sloth, Neocnus comes EX 2000 BC
- Haitian pine forest sloth, Neocnus dousman EX 5000 BC
- Haitian rak bwa sloth, Neocnus toupiti EX 1000 BC
- Greater Haitian ground sloth, Parocnus serus EX 2000 BC
- Hispaniolan monkey, Antillothrix bernensis EX 1600s
- La hotte monkey, Insulacebus toussaintiana EX 1500s

== See also ==
- List of chordate orders
- Lists of mammals by region
- List of prehistoric mammals
- Mammal classification
- List of mammals described in the 2000s
