= Brandt's guiara =

Scientific classification
- Kingdom: Animalia
- Phylum: Chordata
- Class: Mammalia
- Order: Rodentia
- Family: Echimyidae
- Subfamily: Euryzygomatomyinae
- Genus: Euryzygomatomys
- Species: E. guiara

Binomial name
- Euryzygomatomys guiara Brandt, 1835

Species of rodent

Brandt's guiara (Euryzygomatomys guiara) is a Brazilian spiny rat species. It was formerly considered conspecific with E. spinosus.
