= Isla de la Juventud (disambiguation) =

Isla de la Juventud (English: Isle of Youth) is the second-largest Cuban island and the seventh-largest island in the West Indies

It can also refer to:

- Isla de la Juventud (baseball), name of a baseball club based on the island
- Isla De La Juventud tree hutia, or southern hutia (Mysateles meridionalis), species of rodent in the family Capromyidae. It is endemic to lowland moist forests on Isla de la Juventud in Cuba. It is threatened by habitat loss

== See also ==
- Youth Island (disambiguation)
