= Broad-headed spiny rat =

Conservation status
- Least Concern (IUCN 3.1)

Scientific classification
- Kingdom: Animalia
- Phylum: Chordata
- Class: Mammalia
- Infraclass: Placentalia
- Order: Rodentia
- Family: Echimyidae
- Subfamily: Euryzygomatomyinae
- Genus: Clyomys
- Species: C. laticeps

Binomial name
- Clyomys laticeps Thomas, 1909
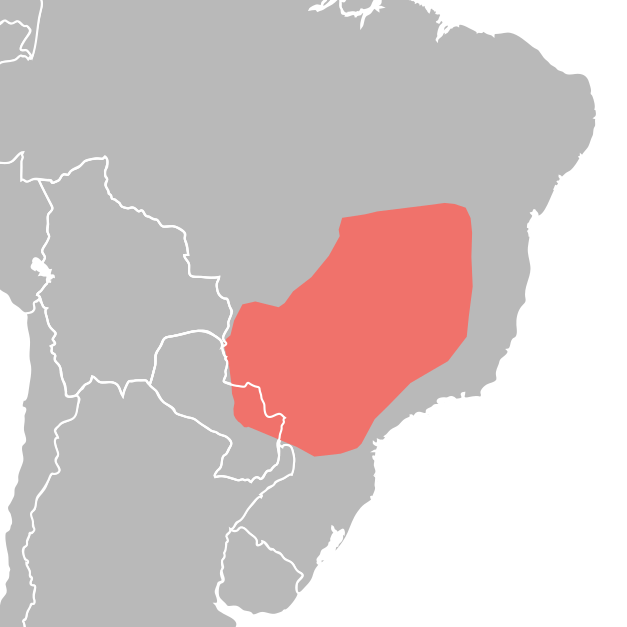
- Clyomys laticeps distribution

Synonyms
- Clyomys bishopi Avila-Pires and Wutke, 1981

Species of rodent

The broad-headed spiny rat (Clyomys laticeps) is a spiny rat species from Brazil and Paraguay. The etymology of the species name is the Latin word laticeps meaning "wide-headed".

== Description ==
The species has a head-body length that ranges from 15 to 30 cm (5.9 to 11.8 in), with a tail 5 to 9 cm (2.0 to 3.5 in) long, and weigh between 180 and 334 g (6.3 and 11.8 oz). They have short ears and limbs, and feet with powerful claws adapted for digging. The fur is interspersed with spines; it is grizzled reddish or yellowish and black over most of the body, and paler grey to almost white on the underparts.

== Distribution and habitat ==
Broad-headed spiny rats are native to southern Brazil and eastern Paraguay, where they inhabit open cerrado habitats at elevations up to 1,100 m (3,600 ft). Within this region, they are found only in unflooded grasslands and open-canopy savannah woodlands, where the soil is soft and suitable for burrowing.

== Biology and behaviour ==
These rats live in colonies and spend much of their life underground. The burrows can be large and relatively complex, with tunnels 8 to 9 cm (3.1 to 3.5 in) wide, spiralling down as much as 85 cm (33 in) to one or more nests lined with grass or containing food stocks. They are herbivorous, and feed mainly on monocots. Births are probably seasonal, with one or two young being born each year, and weaned by the end of the wet season.
