= Jutia =

Jutia may refer to:

- Hutia, a cavy-like rodent
- Jutia, Bangladesh
- Latinized name of Jutland (Jutes' land)
