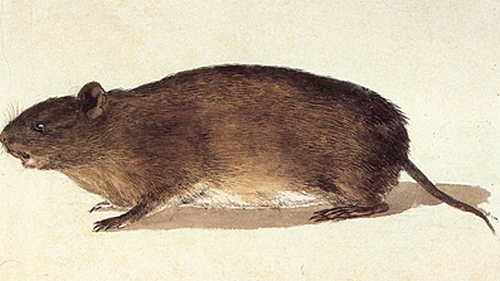
- E. spinosus (1826)

Scientific classification
- Kingdom: Animalia
- Phylum: Chordata
- Class: Mammalia
- Order: Rodentia
- Family: Echimyidae
- Subfamily: Euryzygomatomyinae
- Genus: Euryzygomatomys; Goeldi 1901

Type species
- Rattus spinosus G. Fischer 1814

Species
- Euryzygomatomys guiara Euryzygomatomys spinosus
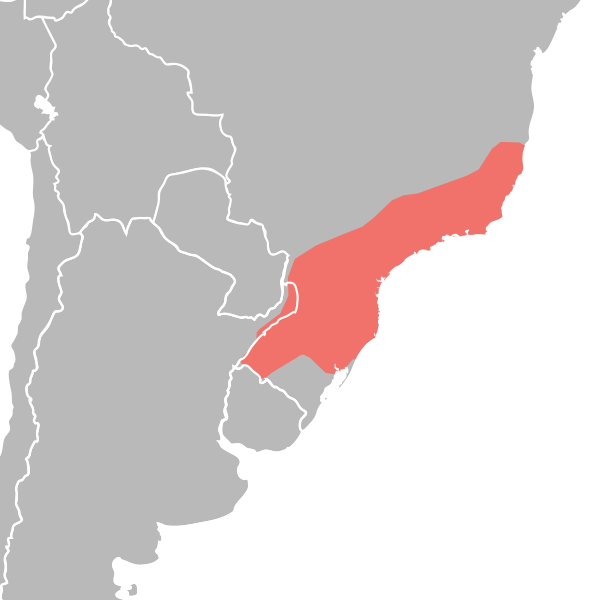
- Euryzygomatomys distribution

= Guiara =

Euryzygomatomys

Genus of mammals belonging to the spiny rat family of rodents

Euryzygomatomys is a genus of South American rodents, commonly called guiaras, in the family Echimyidae. It contains two extant and one fossil species, found in Argentina, Brazil, and Paraguay. They are:

- Brandt's guiara (E. guiara)
- Fischer's guiara (E. spinosus)
- †E. hoffstetteri Goeldi 1901 - Tarija Formation, Bolivia

== Etymology ==
The genus name Euryzygomatomys derives from the three Ancient Greek words εὐρύς (eurús, or eury), meaning "wide, or which extends in width", ζύγωμα or ζύγωματος (zúgōma, zúgōmatos), meaning "a part of the forehead or the zygomatic bone", and μῦς (mûs), meaning "mouse, rat".

== Phylogeny ==
Euryzygomatomys is the sister genus to Clyomys. Both taxa are closely related to the genus Trinomys. In turn, these three genera — forming the clade of Euryzygomatomyinae — share phylogenetic affinities with a clade containing Carterodon and members of the family Capromyidae.

Analyses of craniodental characters proposed that Euryzygomatomys — and also Clyomys — may be associated with Carterodon. However, molecular data suggest the polyphyly of this assemblage of fossorial genera.

Genus-level cladogram of the Euryzygomatomyinae
with their relationship to Carterodon and Capromyidae.

- Octodontoidea
  - Euryzygomatomyinae
    - Trinomys (Atlantic spiny rats)
    - - Clyomys
      - Euryzygomatomys (guiaras)
  - - Carterodon (Owl's spiny rat)
    - Capromyidae
      - Plagiodontini
        Plagiodontia
      - Capromyini
        - Geocapromys
        - - Capromys (Desmarest's hutia)
          - - Mesocapromys
            - Mysateles

The cladogram has been reconstructed from mitochondrial and nuclear DNA characters. According to this phylogenetic tree, the fossorial genera Euryzygomatomys, Clyomys, and Carterodon constitute a polyphyletic assemblage (red bar).
