= Isla De La Juventud tree hutia =

Conservation status
- Critically Endangered (IUCN 3.1)

Scientific classification
- Kingdom: Animalia
- Phylum: Chordata
- Class: Mammalia
- Order: Rodentia
- Family: Echimyidae
- Genus: Mysateles
- Species: M. prehensilis
- Subspecies: M. p. meridionalis

Trinomial name
- Mysateles prehensilis meridionalis (Varona, 1986)

Synonyms
- Mysateles meridionalis

Subspecies of rodent

The Isla De La Juventud tree hutia or southern hutia (Mysateles prehensilis meridionalis) is a subspecies of rodent in the subfamily Capromyinae. It is endemic to lowland moist forests on Isla de la Juventud in Cuba. It is threatened by habitat loss and is considered Critically Endangered by the IUCN Red List.

It was formerly considered its own species, but phylogenetic analysis indicates that it is a subspecies of the prehensile-tailed hutia (M. prehensilis).
