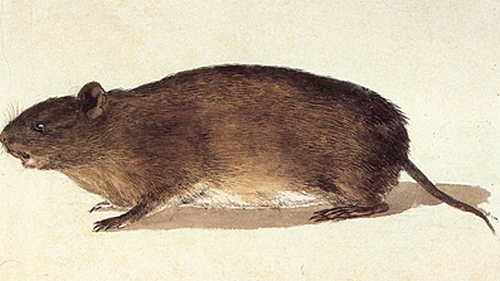

Conservation status
- Least Concern (IUCN 3.1)

Scientific classification
- Kingdom: Animalia
- Phylum: Chordata
- Class: Mammalia
- Order: Rodentia
- Family: Echimyidae
- Subfamily: Euryzygomatomyinae
- Genus: Euryzygomatomys
- Species: E. spinosus

Binomial name
- Euryzygomatomys spinosus (G. Fischer, 1814)

= Fischer's guiara =

Fischer's guiara Temporal range: Pleistocene to Recent

Species of rodent

Fischer's guiara (Euryzygomatomys spinosus), is a spiny rat species found in Argentina, Brazil and Paraguay. It is one of only two species in the genus Euryzygomatomys. Its karyotype has 2n=46 and FN=88.
