= Owl's spiny rat =

Owl's spiny rat Temporal range: Pleistocene to Recent

Conservation status
- Data Deficient (IUCN 3.1)

Scientific classification
- Kingdom: Animalia
- Phylum: Chordata
- Class: Mammalia
- Infraclass: Placentalia
- Order: Rodentia
- Family: Echimyidae
- Genus: Carterodon; Waterhouse, 1848
- Species: C. sulcidens

Binomial name
- Carterodon sulcidens (Lund, 1838)
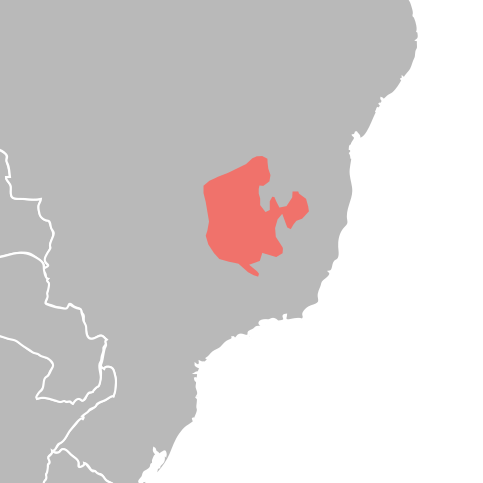
- Carterodon sulcidens distribution

Species of mammal belonging to the spiny rat family of rodents

Owl's spiny rat (Carterodon sulcidens) is a rodent species in the family Echimyidae found in Brazil. It is the only species in the genus Carterodon. Owl's spiny rat has evolved characteristics such as a heightened ability to dig in open grasslands during times of environmental change.

== Phylogeny ==
The genus Carterodon is the sister group to the family Capromyidae (hutias). In turn, this clade shares evolutionary affinities with some genera of spiny rats belonging to the subfamily Euryzygomatomyinae.

Analyses of craniodental characters proposed that Carterodon may be associated with Clyomys and Euryzygomatomys. However, molecular data suggest the polyphyly of this assemblage of fossorial genera.

Cladogram showing the relationship of Carterodon
with Capromyidae and Euryzygomatomyinae.

- Octodontoidea
  - Euryzygomatomyinae
    - Trinomys (Atlantic spiny rats)
    - - Clyomys
      - Euryzygomatomys (guiaras)
  - - Carterodon (Owl's spiny rat)
    - Capromyidae
      - Plagiodontini
        Plagiodontia
      - Capromyini
        - Geocapromys
        - - Capromys (Desmarest's hutia)
          - - Mesocapromys
            - Mysateles

The cladogram has been reconstructed from mitochondrial and nuclear DNA characters. According to this phylogenetic tree, the fossorial genera Carterodon, Clyomys, and Euryzygomatomys constitute a polyphyletic assemblage (red bar).
