= Clyomys =

Scientific classification
- Kingdom: Animalia
- Phylum: Chordata
- Class: Mammalia
- Order: Rodentia
- Family: Echimyidae
- Subfamily: Euryzygomatomyinae
- Genus: Clyomys; Thomas, 1916

Type species
- Echimys laticeps Thomas, 1909

Species
- Clyomys laticeps
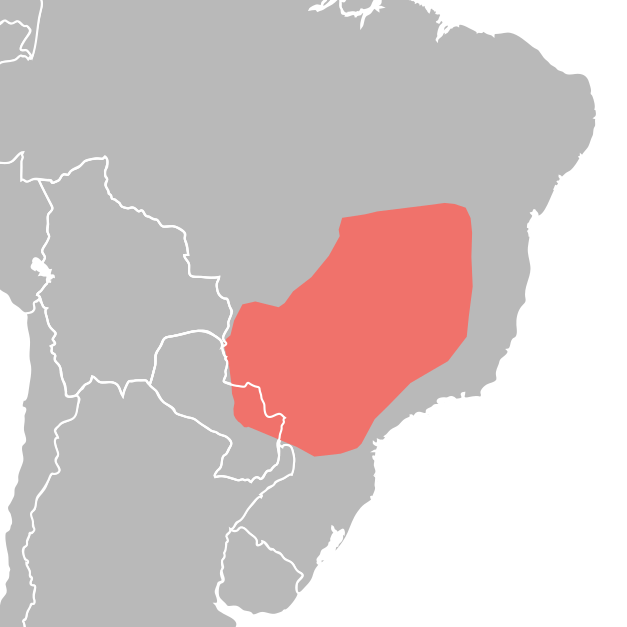
- Extant Clyomys distribution

Genus of mammals belonging to the spiny rat family of rodents

Clyomys is a South American rodent genus in the family Echimyidae. It contains two species, found in tropical savannas and grasslands from circa 100 m (300 ft) to 1,100 m (3,600 ft) elevation in central Brazil and eastern Paraguay.

The term Clyomys derives from the two ancient Greek words κλύω (klúō, or clyo), meaning "to listen, to prick up one's ears", and μῦς (mûs), meaning "mouse, rat".

The Clyomys species are:

- Broad-headed spiny rat (C. laticeps)
- †C. riograndensis

== Phylogeny ==
Clyomys is the sister genus to Euryzygomatomys. Both taxa are closely related to the genus Trinomys. In turn, these three genera — forming the clade of Euryzygomatomyinae — share phylogenetic affinities with a clade containing Carterodon and members of the family Capromyidae.

Analyses of craniodental characters proposed that Clyomys — and also Euryzygomatomys — may be associated with Carterodon. However, molecular data suggest the polyphyly of this assemblage of fossorial genera.

Genus-level cladogram of the Euryzygomatomyinae
with their relationship to Carterodon and Capromyidae.

- Octodontoidea
  - Euryzygomatomyinae
    - Trinomys (Atlantic spiny rats)
    - - Clyomys
      - Euryzygomatomys (guiaras)
  - - Carterodon (Owl's spiny rat)
    - Capromyidae
      - Plagiodontini
        Plagiodontia
      - Capromyini
        - Geocapromys
        - - Capromys (Desmarest's hutia)
          - - Mesocapromys
            - Mysateles

The cladogram has been reconstructed from mitochondrial and nuclear DNA characters. According to this phylogenetic tree, the fossorial genera Euryzygomatomys, Clyomys, and Carterodon constitute a polyphyletic assemblage (red bar).
