= Cuban coney =

Conservation status
- Extinct (IUCN 3.1)

Scientific classification
- Kingdom: Animalia
- Phylum: Chordata
- Class: Mammalia
- Order: Rodentia
- Family: Echimyidae
- Genus: Geocapromys
- Species: †G. columbianus

Binomial name
- †Geocapromys columbianus (Chapman, 1892)

Extinct species of rodent

The Cuban coney (Geocapromys columbianus) is an extinct species of rodent in the subfamily Capromyinae. It was endemic to Cuba. Its natural habitats were lowlands moist forests, xeric shrublands and rocky areas. Some scientists indicate that this species may have survived and coexisted with introduced rat species from the Old World until approximately 1500, while others indicate that it became extinct earlier in the Holocene.
