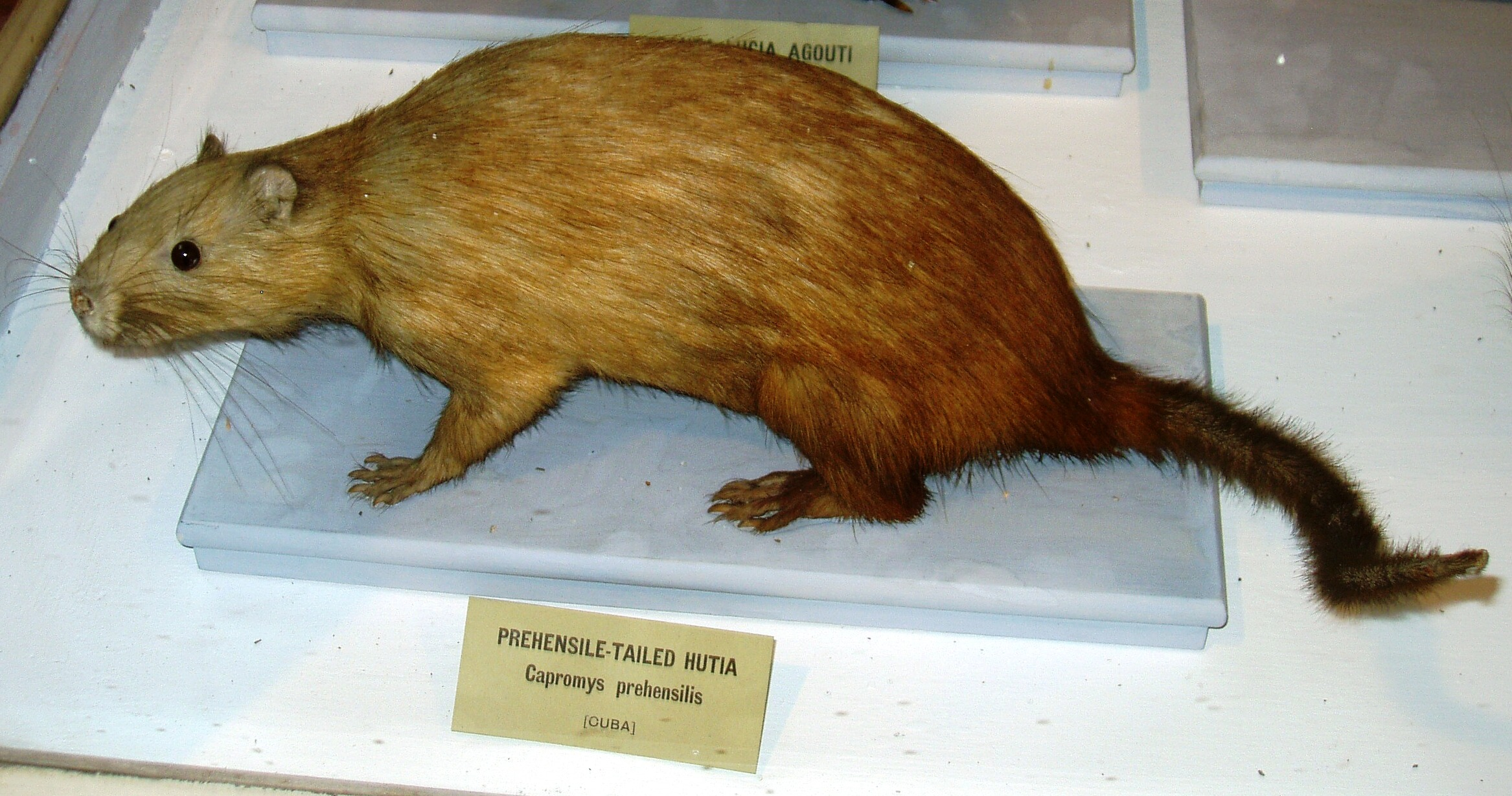

Conservation status
- Near Threatened (IUCN 3.1)

Scientific classification
- Kingdom: Animalia
- Phylum: Chordata
- Class: Mammalia
- Order: Rodentia
- Family: Echimyidae
- Subfamily: Capromyinae
- Tribe: Capromyini
- Genus: Mysateles; Lesson, 1842
- Species: M. prehensilis

Binomial name
- Mysateles prehensilis (Poeppig, 1824)

Subspecies
- M. p. prehensilis (Poeppig, 1824); M. p. gundlachi (Chapman, 1901); M. p. meridionalis (Varona, 1986)
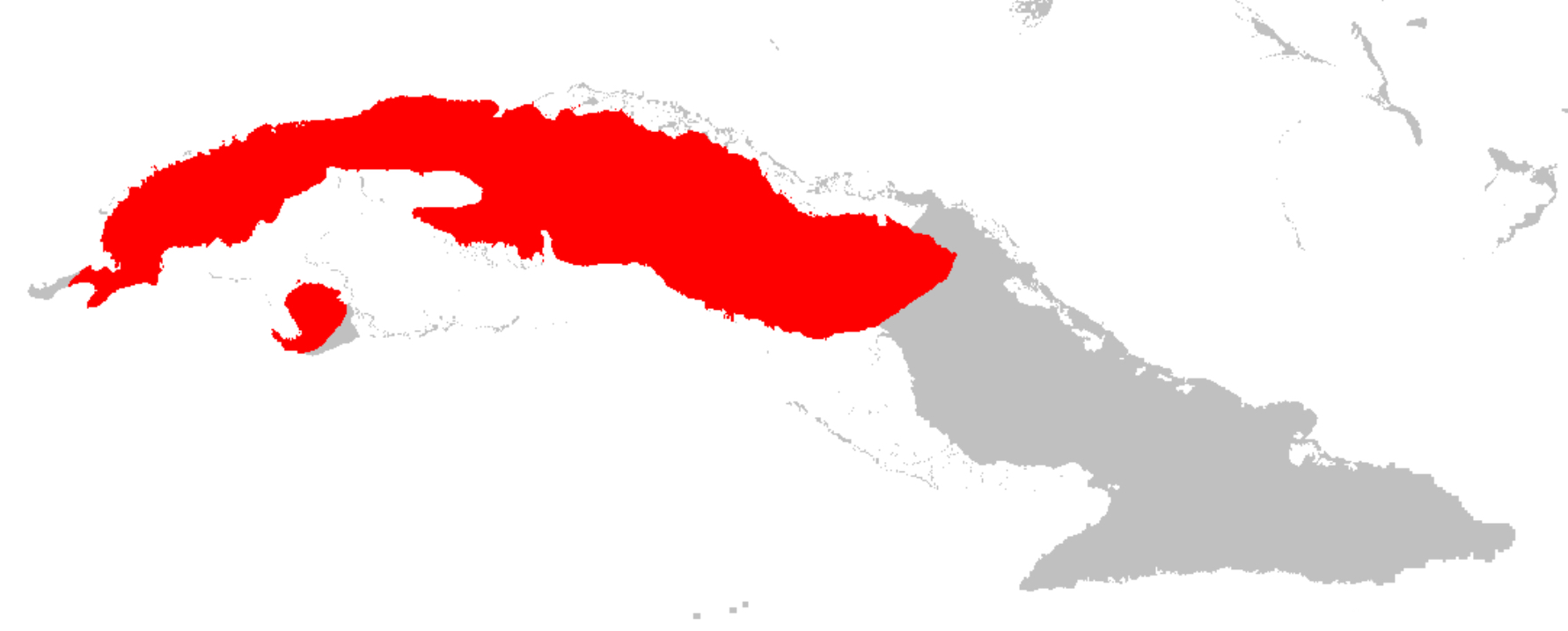

= Prehensile-tailed hutia =

Species of rodent

The prehensile-tailed hutia (Mysateles prehensilis) is a small, furry, rat-like mammal found only in forests on Cuba. It is the only member of the genus Mysateles. It climbs and lives in trees where it eats only leaves, and it is threatened by habitat loss. The prehensile-tailed hutia is a member of the hutia subfamily (Capromyinae), a group of rodents native to the Caribbean that are mostly endangered or extinct.

== Taxonomy ==
The genus name Mysateles derives from the two ancient greek words μῦς (mûs), meaning "mouse, rat", and ἀτέλεια (atéleia), meaning "incomplete, imperfect".

Within Capromyidae, the closest relative of Mysateles is the genus Mesocapromys. Both genera are the sister group to Capromys, and then Geocapromys is a more distant genus. In turn, these four genera belong to the tribe Capromyini, and are the sister group to Plagiodontia.

Genus-level cladogram of the Capromyidae
with their relationship to Carterodon and Euryzygomatomyinae.

- Octodontoidea
  - Euryzygomatomyinae
    - Trinomys (Atlantic spiny rats)
    - - Clyomys
      - Euryzygomatomys (guiaras)
  - - Carterodon (Owl's spiny rat)
    - Capromyidae
      - Plagiodontini
        Plagiodontia
      - Capromyini
        - Geocapromys
        - - Capromys (Desmarest's hutia)
          - - Mesocapromys
            - Mysateles

The cladogram has been reconstructed from mitochondrial and nuclear DNA characters.

Several other hutia species such as Garrido's hutia (Capromys garridoi) and the black-tailed hutia (Mesocapromys melanurus) were formerly classified in Mysateles, but phylogenetic evidence found them to belong in different genera, leaving only M. prehensilis in Mysateles.

There are three subspecies: the nominate M. prehensilis prehensilis, the Isla De La Juventud tree hutia (M. p. meridionalis) and M. p. gundlachi (also known as Chapman's prehensile-tailed hutia or Gundlach's hutia), which is named in honor of Cuban naturalist Juan Gundlach. The latter was previously considered a separate species (Mysateles gundlachi). M. p. meridionalis was also previously considered a separate species, but was found to be a subspecies by phylogenetic studies.

== Genetics ==
Its karyotype has 2n = 34 and FN = 54–56.

== Habitat and conservation ==
The species is found in both primary and secondary forest. It is listed as near threatened on the IUCN Red List. Although locally common in some areas, it is in decline and is threatened by deforestation and habitat fragmentation.
