= Youth Island =

Youth Island, Isle of Youth or Island of Youth may refer to:

- Insel der Jugend ("Youth Island"), an islet on the Spree river in Alt-Treptow, Berlin, Germany.
- Isla de la Juventud ("Island of Youth"), the second largest island in Cuba, and the largest of the 350 islands in the Canarreos Archipelago (Archipiélago de los Canarreos).
- Otok hrvatske mladeži ("Island of the Croatian Youth"), or "Youth Island", an island in lake Juran, Zagreb, Croatia, home of the annual InMusic Festival
- Tír na nÓg ("Land of the Young"), an island in Irish mythology.
- Ungdomsøen ("The Youth Island"), a youth camp on Middelgrund island, Copenhagen.
