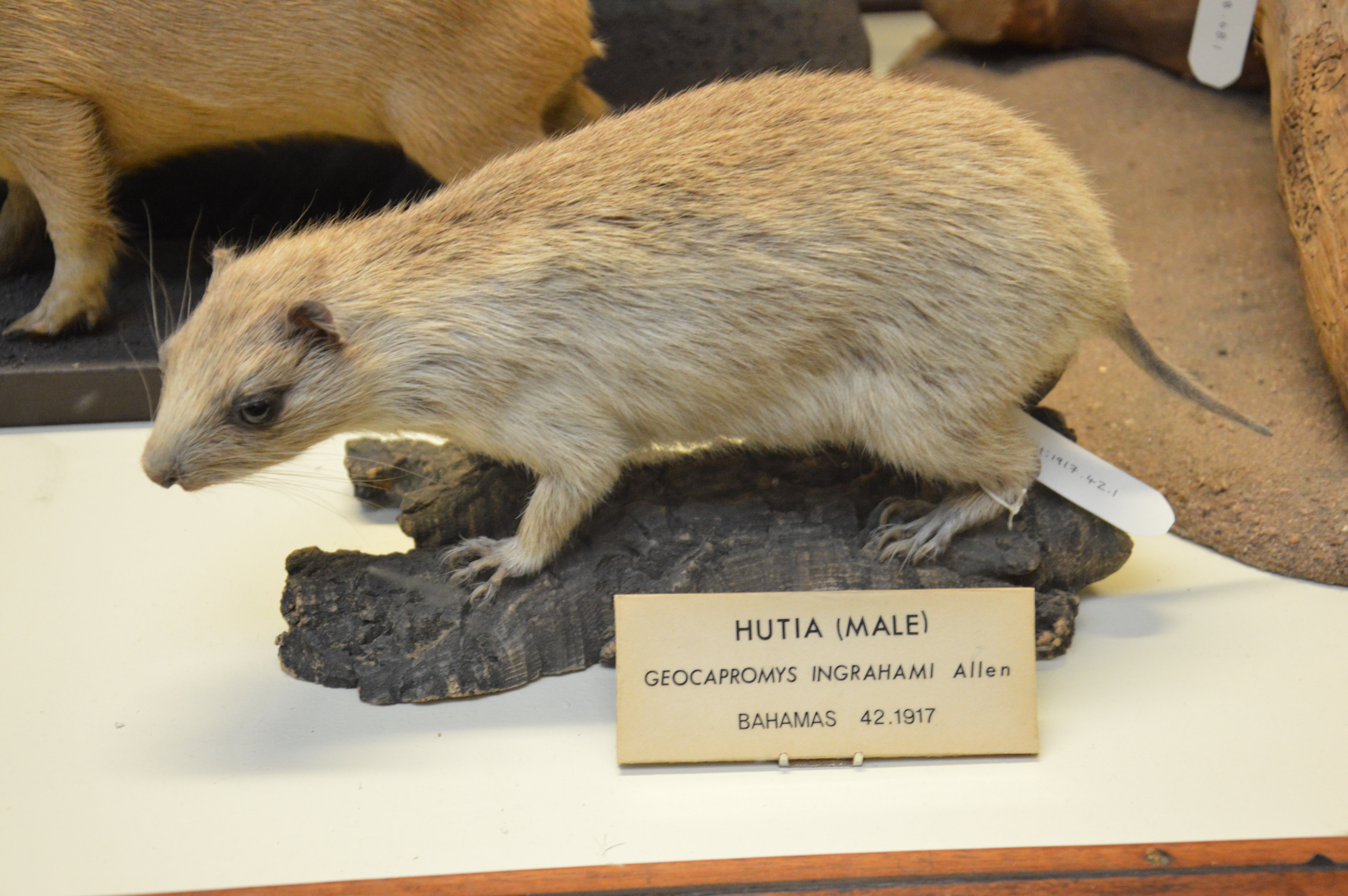

Conservation status
- Critically Endangered (IUCN 3.1)

Scientific classification
- Kingdom: Animalia
- Phylum: Chordata
- Class: Mammalia
- Order: Rodentia
- Family: Echimyidae
- Genus: Geocapromys
- Species: G. ingrahami

Binomial name
- Geocapromys ingrahami (J. A. Allen, 1891)
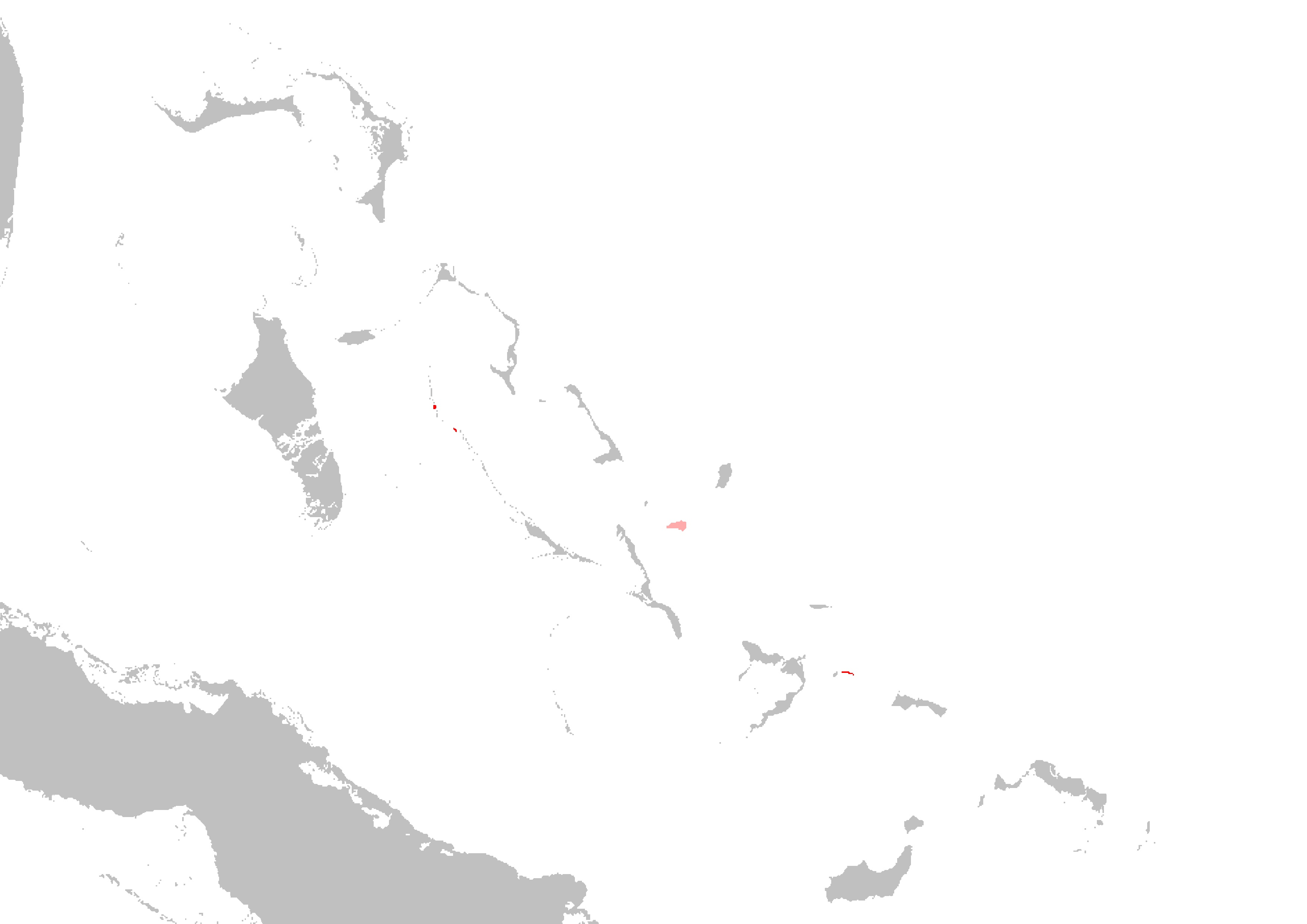
- Red: extant Light red: possibly extant

= Bahamian hutia =

Species of rodent

The Bahamian hutia or Ingraham's hutia (Geocapromys ingrahami) is a small, furry, rat-like mammal found only in the Bahamas. About the size of a rabbit, it lives in burrows in forests or shrubland, emerging at night to feed on leaves, fruit, and other plant matter. It was believed extinct until rediscovery in 1964, and it remains the focus of conservation efforts. The Bahamian hutia is a member of the hutia subfamily (Capromyinae), a group of rodents native to the Caribbean, many of which are endangered or extinct.

== Description ==
The Bahamian hutia is a rat-like rodent with a short tail and a body-length of up to 60 centimetres (24 in). Its fur varies in colour and can be black, brown, grey, white or reddish.

== Distribution and habitat ==
The Bahamian hutia is endemic to the Bahamas. Its natural habitats are subtropical or tropical moist lowland forest, subtropical or tropical dry shrubland, and rocky areas. It was believed to be extinct until 1966, when biologist Garrett Clough found a relict population on East Plana Cay, a small, uninhabited strip of land east of Long Island, Bahamas, between Acklins Island and Mayaguana Island. The Plana Cays are the last natural habitat of the Bahamian hutia and are currently home to most of the remaining population. Colonist hutias were introduced into isolated parts of the Exuma Cays Land and Sea Park in 1973 as a conservation measure. The IUCN puts it as possibly extant in the Turks and Caicos islands.

== Behaviour ==
The Bahamian hutia is a nocturnal species, remaining underground during the day. It can climb trees but mostly forages on or close to the ground, feeding on leaves, shoots, fruit, nuts and bark and occasionally insects or small lizards. It has been known to feed on seaweed.

Adults form lasting pair bonds and breeding can occur at any time of year. Up to four young are born after a gestation period of about four months. They are able to eat solid food after a few days and may stay as a family group for up to two years, by which time they are sexually mature.

Different species of hutia vary greatly in temperament, but biologist Garrett Clough described the Bahamian hutia as "a most peaceable rodent".

== Status ==
Two subspecies became extinct in modern times. The Crooked Island hutia (G. i. irrectus) and the Great Abaco hutia (G. i. abaconis) were mentioned by early European voyagers, and are thought to have become extinct by 1600. This is thought to be due to land clearance rather than direct hunting.

As this rodent is known from only six locations, the International Union for Conservation of Nature has rated its conservation status as being "critically endangered". Its population, though small, is believed to be steady, but it could be threatened by adverse conditions, such as a hurricane, or by the arrival on the islands of predators, such as feral cats.

== See also ==
- Hutia
- Bahamian dry forests
