= Not evaluated =

IUCN Red List category

A not evaluated (NE) species is one which has been categorized under the IUCN Red List of threatened species as not yet having been assessed by the International Union for Conservation of Nature. A species which is uncategorized and cannot be found in the IUCN repository is also considered not evaluated.

== Description ==
This conservation category is one of nine IUCN threat assessment categories for species to indicate their risk of global extinction. The categories range from extinct (EX) at one end of the spectrum, to least concern (LC) at the other. The categories data deficient and not evaluated (NE) are not on the spectrum, because they indicate species that have not been reviewed enough to assign to a category.

The category of not evaluated does not indicate that a species is not at risk of extinction, but simply that the species has not yet been studied for any risk to be quantified and published. The IUCN advises that species categorised as not evaluated "... should not be treated as if they were non-threatened. It may be appropriate ... to give them the same degree of attention as threatened taxa, at least until their status can be assessed."

By 2015, the IUCN had assessed and allocated conservation statuses to over 76,000 species worldwide. From these it had categorised some 24,000 species as globally threatened at one conservation level or another. However, despite estimates varying widely as to the number of species existing on Earth (ranging from ~3 million up to ~30 million), this means the IUCN's 'not evaluated' (NE) category is by far the largest of all nine extinction risk categories.

== Other applications ==
The global IUCN assessment and categorization process has subsequently been applied at country and sometimes at regional levels as the basis for assessing conservation threats and for establishing individual Red Data lists for those areas.

Assessment criteria have also begun to be applied as a way of categorizing threats to ecosystems, with every ecosystem falling into the IUCN category 'not evaluated' prior to the start of the assessment process.

== See also ==
- Data deficient
- Convention on Biological Diversity
