= Montane hutia =

Conservation status
- Extinct (IUCN 3.1)

Scientific classification
- Kingdom: Animalia
- Phylum: Chordata
- Class: Mammalia
- Order: Rodentia
- Family: Echimyidae
- Genus: †Isolobodon
- Species: †I. montanus

Binomial name
- †Isolobodon montanus (Miller, 1922)

Extinct species of rodent

The montane hutia (Isolobodon montanus) is an extinct species of rodent in the subfamily Capromyinae. It was endemic to Hispaniola (the Dominican Republic and Haiti).

== History ==
The remains were found in association with those from rats of the genus Rattus, which suggests that the montane hutia survived until the time of European colonization of the island, and may have gone extinct due to competition from introduced rodents.
