= Lemke's hutia =

Lemke's hutia Temporal range: Late Pleistocene to late Holocene

Conservation status
- Extinct

Scientific classification
- Kingdom: Animalia
- Phylum: Chordata
- Class: Mammalia
- Order: Rodentia
- Family: Echimyidae
- Subfamily: Capromyinae
- Tribe: Plagiodontini
- Genus: †Rhizoplagiodontia; Woods, 1989
- Species: †R. lemkei

Binomial name
- †Rhizoplagiodontia lemkei Woods, 1989

Extinct species of rodent

Lemke's hutia (Rhizoplagiodontia lemkei) is an extinct species of rodent in the subfamily Capromyinae. It is monotypic within the genus Rhizoplagiodontia. It was endemic to Hispaniola (the Dominican Republic and Haiti). Its natural habitat was subtropical or tropical moist lowland forests. It is thought to have gone extinct after European colonization of the islands.
