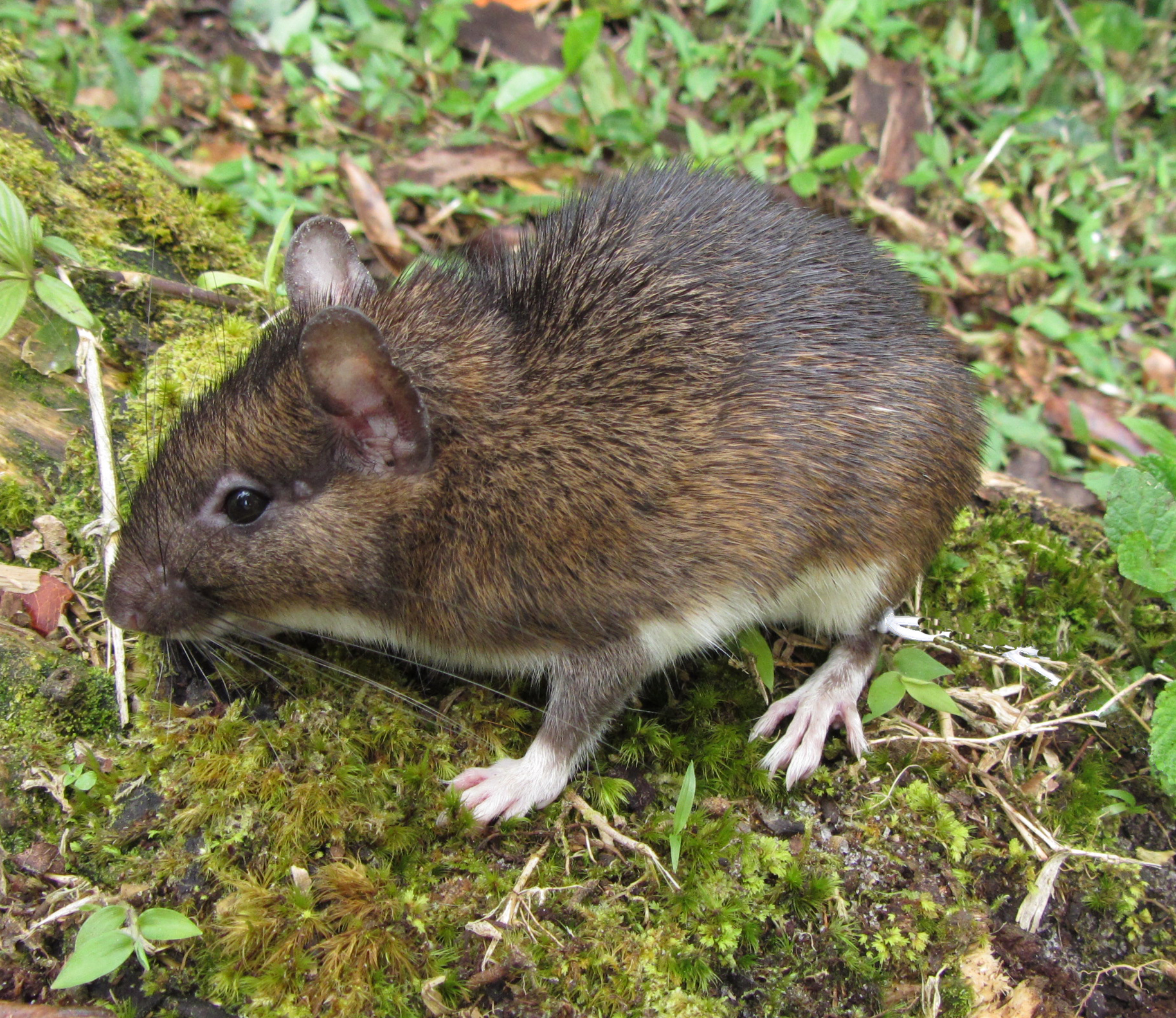
- Trinomys, a member of the subfamily Euryzygomatomyinae.

Scientific classification
- Kingdom: Animalia
- Phylum: Chordata
- Class: Mammalia
- Order: Rodentia
- Parvorder: Caviomorpha
- Superfamily: Octodontoidea
- Family: Echimyidae
- Subfamily: Euryzygomatomyinae; Fabre et al. 2017

Genera
- Clyomys; Euryzygomatomys; Trinomys

= Euryzygomatomyinae =

Subfamily of rodents

Euryzygomatinae is a subfamily of rodents, proposed in 2017, and containing three extant genera of spiny Echimyidae: Clyomys, Euryzygomatomys, and Trinomys.

Members of this echimyid subfamily all share an origin in the eastern part of Brazil, close to the Atlantic Forest.

== Morpho-anatomy ==
The teeth of Euryzygomatomyines are characterized by several features:

- elongate lower and upper incisor roots;
- five lophids on the lower deciduous premolars 4;
- either four lophids in Trinomys, or three lophids in Clyomys and Euryzygomatomys, on the lower molars 1;
- well-connected lophs on the cheek teeth;
- three molar roots anchoring the upper molars.

Their zygomatic arch is reduced with a slightly concave dorsal margin, and the jugal bone is ventrally expanded with much reduced, scarcely salient inferior process.

== Molecular signatures ==
At the protein level, one amino acid replacement from leucine to proline yields a shared derived character state that is diagnostic for defining the Euryzygomatomyinae: the amino-acid proline at position homologous to site 294 of the human GHR.

== Phylogeny ==
Within Euryzygomatomyinae, Clyomys is the sister group to Euryzygomatomys. In turn, these two fossorial genera are the sister group to the terrestrial Trinomys.

In the phylogeny of the family Echimyidae, Euryzygomatomyinae is the sister group to a large assemblage comprising Carterodon and the family Capromyidae. These phylogenetic relationships, based on the comparison of complete mitochondrial DNA genomes and nuclear DNA exons, disagree with analyses of craniodental characters which cluster together the fossorial genera Clyomys, Euryzygomatomys and Carterodon.

Genus-level cladogram of the Euryzygomatomyinae
with their relation to Carterodon and Capromyidae.

- Octodontoidea
  - Euryzygomatomyinae
    - Trinomys (Atlantic spiny rats)
    - - Clyomys
      - Euryzygomatomys (guiaras)
  - - Carterodon (Owl's spiny rat)
    - Capromyidae
      - Plagiodontini
        Plagiodontia
      - Capromyini
        - Geocapromys
        - - Capromys (Desmarest's hutia)
          - - Mesocapromys
            - Mysateles

This cladogram has been reconstructed from mitochondrial and nuclear DNA characters. According to this phylogenetic tree, the fossorial genera Euryzygomatomys, Clyomys, and Carterodon constitute a polyphyletic assemblage (red bar).
