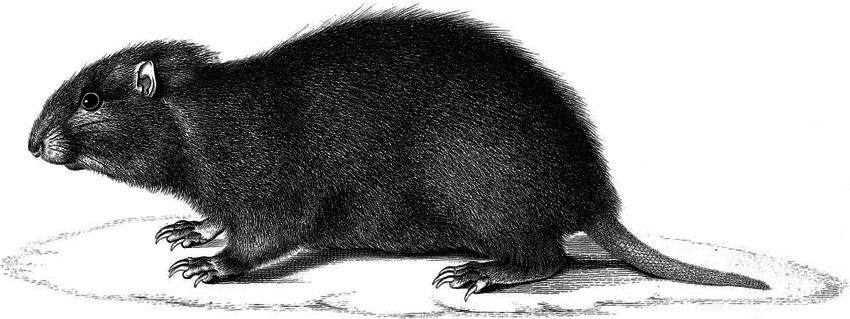
- Hispaniolan hutia (P. aedium)

Scientific classification
- Kingdom: Animalia
- Phylum: Chordata
- Class: Mammalia
- Order: Rodentia
- Family: Echimyidae
- Subfamily: Capromyinae
- Tribe: Plagiodontini
- Genus: Plagiodontia; F. Cuvier, 1836

Type species
- Plagiodontia aedium F. Cuvier, 1836

Species
- Plagiodontia aedium † Plagiodontia ipnaeum † Plagiodontia spelaeum

= Plagiodontia =

Genus of mammals belonging to the hutia subfamily of rodents

Plagiodontia is a genus of rodent in the subfamily Capromyinae (hutias). All known species are endemic to the Caribbean island of Hispaniola (in the present-day Dominican Republic and Haiti).

The genus name Plagiodontia means "oblique tooth", and derives from the two ancient greek words πλάγιος (plágios), meaning "placed sideways", and ὀδούς, ὀδόντος (odoús, odóntos), meaning "tooth".

== Systematics ==
This genus contains the following three species (two of them extinct):

- Hispaniolan hutia (Plagiodontia aedium) F. Cuvier, 1836
- † Samaná hutia (Plagiodontia ipnaeum) Johnson, 1948
- † Plagiodontia spelaeum Miller, 1929

== Phylogeny ==
Within Capromyidae, Plagiodontia is the deepest branching genus, belonging to the tribe Plagiodontini. It is the sister group to the other genera Geocapromys, Mesocapromys, Mysateles and Capromys, all belonging to the tribe Capromyini.

Genus-level cladogram of the Capromyidae
with their relationship to Carterodon and Euryzygomatomyinae.

- Octodontoidea
  - Euryzygomatomyinae
    - Trinomys (Atlantic spiny rats)
    - - Clyomys
      - Euryzygomatomys (guiaras)
  - - Carterodon (Owl's spiny rat)
    - Capromyidae
      - Plagiodontini
        Plagiodontia
      - Capromyini
        - Geocapromys
        - - Capromys (Desmarest's hutia)
          - - Mesocapromys
            - Mysateles

The cladogram has been reconstructed from mitochondrial and nuclear DNA characters.
