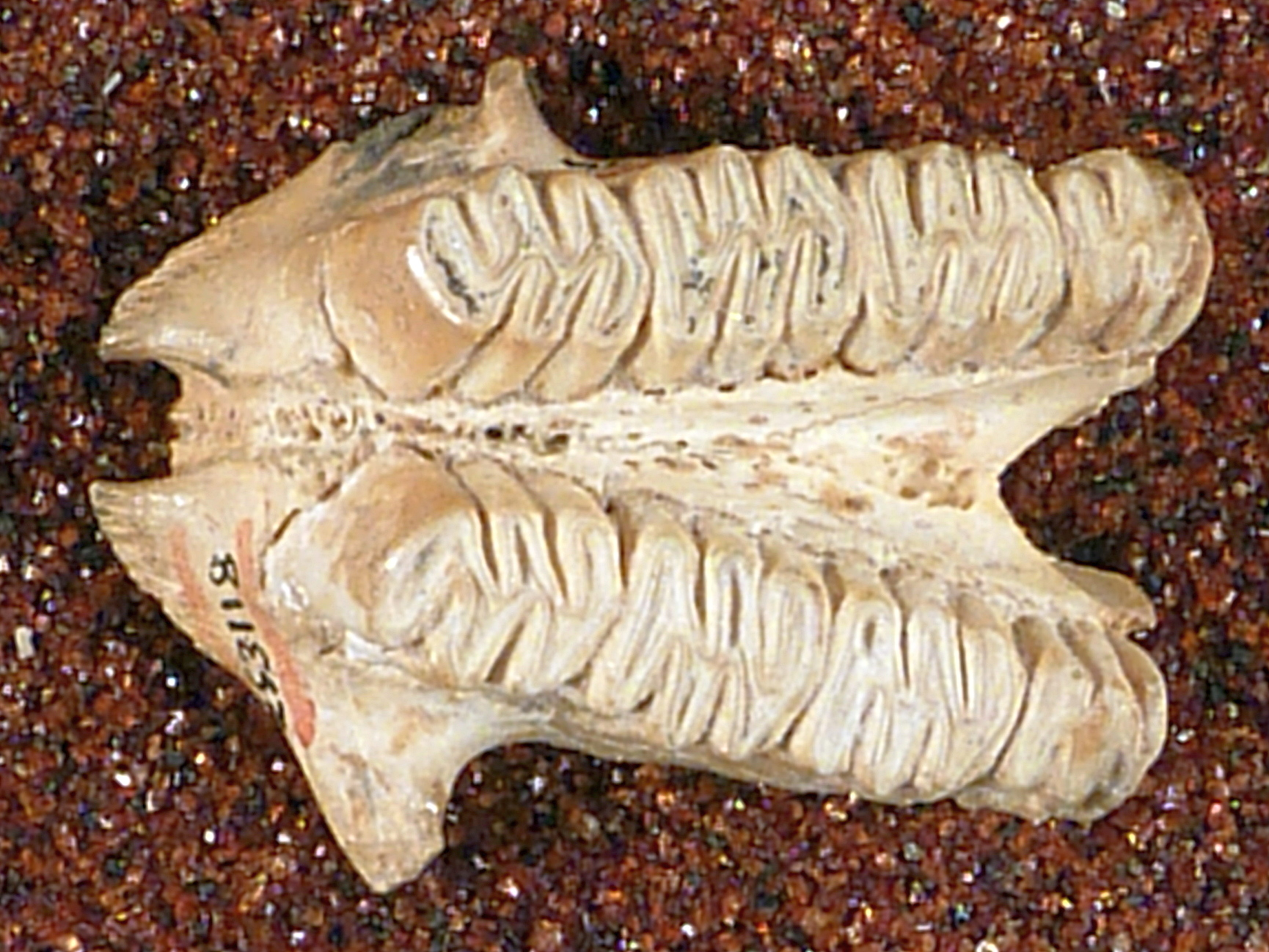

Conservation status
- Extinct (IUCN 3.1)

Scientific classification
- Kingdom: Animalia
- Phylum: Chordata
- Class: Mammalia
- Order: Rodentia
- Family: Echimyidae
- Subfamily: Capromyinae
- Tribe: †Hexolobodontini; Woods, 1989
- Genus: †Hexolobodon; Miller, 1929
- Species: †H. phenax

Binomial name
- †Hexolobodon phenax Miller, 1929

= Imposter hutia =

Extinct species of rodent

The imposter hutia (Hexolobodon phenax) is an extinct species of rodent in the hutia subfamily (Capromyinae). It is the only species in the genus Hexolobodon and tribe Hexolobodontini. It was found only on the Caribbean island of Hispaniola (Haiti and the Dominican Republic), and went extinct sometime after European colonization in the 1500s.

== History ==
The remains were found in association with those from rats of the genus Rattus, which suggests that the imposter hutia survived until the time of European colonization of the island, and may have gone extinct due to predation from introduced rodents.
