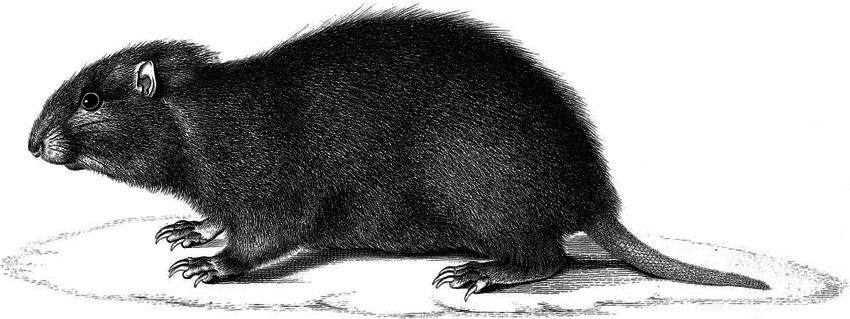

Conservation status
- Least Concern (IUCN 3.1)

Scientific classification
- Kingdom: Animalia
- Phylum: Chordata
- Class: Mammalia
- Order: Rodentia
- Family: Echimyidae
- Genus: Plagiodontia
- Species: P. aedium

Binomial name
- Plagiodontia aedium (F. Cuvier, 1836)

Subspecies
- P. a. aedium; P. a. hylaeum
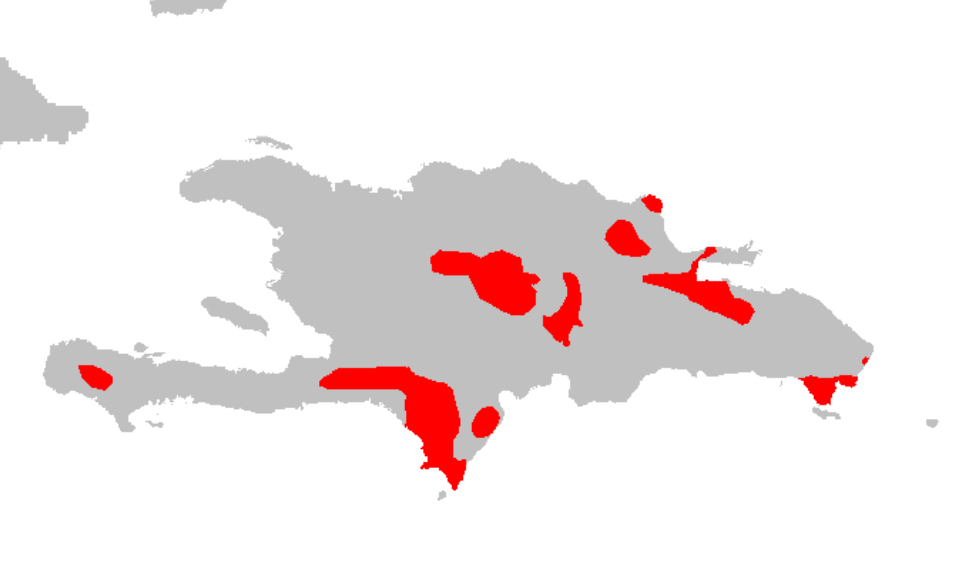

= Hispaniolan hutia =

Species of rodent endemic to Hispaniola

The Hispaniolan hutia (Plagiodontia aedium) is a small, rat-like mammal endemic to forests on the Caribbean island of Hispaniola (split between Haiti and the Dominican Republic). It lives in burrows or trees, and is active at night when it feeds on roots and fruits. A member of the hutia subfamily (Capromyinae), threats to the Hispaniolan hutia include habitat loss and introduced species, such as rats or feral dogs.

The Hispaniolan hutia is the only living species of the genus Plagiodontia; the other two species, also native to Hispaniola, are extinct. There are two subspecies, Cuvier's hutia (P. a. aedium) and the Dominican hutia (P. a. hylaeum). Though many mammals were once native to the island, only the Hispaniolan hutia and the shrew-like Hispaniolan solenodon, which shares the same forest habitat, are alive today.

== Name ==
The genus name Plagiodontia means "oblique tooth" in Greek, referring to its teeth. The common name "hutia" comes, via Spanish jutía, from the animal's name in Taíno, an Indigenous language of the Caribbean.

== Description ==
The head and body length is about 312 millimetres (12.3 in), and its tail length is about 153 millimetres (6.0 in). The listed adult weight as 1.267 kilograms (2.79 lb). In the subspecies P. a. hylaeum, head and body length is 348–405 millimetres (13.7–15.9 in), and tail length is 125–145 mm. The short, dense pelage is brownish or grayish on the upper parts and buffy on the underparts. The tail is scaly, and practically naked. Both the forefoot and the hind foot have five digits, all armed with claws (except the thumb, which has a short, blunt nail). Females have three pairs of lateral thoracic mammae.

== Behaviour ==
Captive hutias have been observed to be nocturnal and arboreal, and to use nest boxes placed high off the ground. Wild specimens are reported to be active only at night; they hide during the day, feed mainly on roots and fruits, and live in male-female pairs. Reports also stated that three or four individuals commonly occupy the same burrow system. Individuals communicate through soft, almost bird-like chirps.

Specimens of the P. a. hylaeum subspecies were caught in December in hollow trees near a lagoon; four pregnant females each contained a single embryo. Purportedly, captive female P. aedium have an estrous cycle of 10 days, a gestation period of 119 days, and apparently bear a single offspring. Recorded gestation has been 123–150 days and litter sizes of one to two young in this species, which are highly precocial, unlike most rodents, which are totally helpless when born. A captive P. aedium was recorded to live for 9 years and 11 months.

== Ecology ==
Hispaniolan hutias inhabit both dry and moist forests on the island. It is reported that they occupy rough hillsides and ravines from sea level to 2,000 meters in elevation; some populations use burrows and feed near the ground, and other populations may den in tree cavities and move through the trees, rather than descend to ground level.

== Conservation ==
Two of the three species in this genus are known only by skeletal remains, often found in association with human kitchen middens or introduced rats. These two species (along with other related hutias on Hispaniola) probably disappeared by the seventeenth century because of excessive hunting by people. P. a. aedium and P. a. hylaeum have been greatly reduced in range and numbers and are threatened by deforestation, hunting, competition from introduced rodents such as rats and mice, and predation by the introduced small Indian mongoose (Urva auropunctata), as well as feral dogs and cats. The human population of Hispaniola is increasing, most of the island's forest cover is being cleared for agriculture, and hutias are usually killed whenever encountered.

The IUCN regards P. a. hylaeum as a subspecies of P. aedium. P. a. hylaeum is called the Dominican hutia, while the nominate race, P. a. aedium is referred to as Cuvier's hutia. Recent surveys in Haiti have found P. aedium to be living as remnant populations in the southeast and on the Massif de la Hotte. The IUCN Red List classifies P. aedium as "least concern" as of 2024, though its population is declining due to loss of forest habitat, human hunting and predation by non-native animals such as dogs. Recent genetic research has identified three distinct populations of P. aedium.

Its presence in several protected areas has recently been confirmed by a Darwin Initiative–funded project known as The Last Survivors; these include Jaragua, Del Este, Los Haitises, and Sierra de Bahoruco National Parks. Hutia population have also been discovered in privately protected areas such as Punta Cana Ecological Reserve. There were sightings in 2005 which were confirmed photographically in the Bahoruco region and evidence suggest that this area may have a substantial hutia population in and around the protected area.
