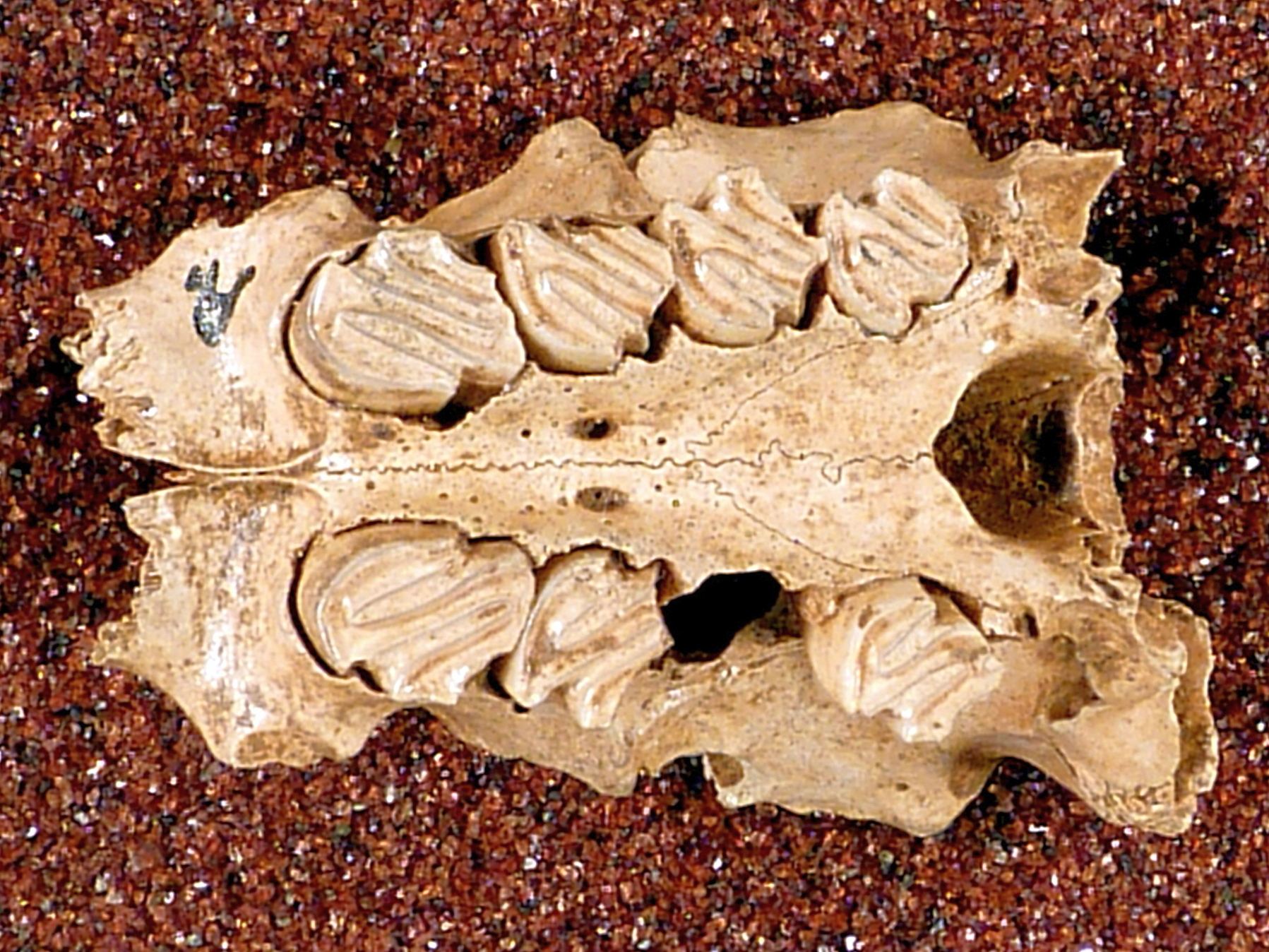

Conservation status
- Extinct (yes) (IUCN 3.1)

Scientific classification
- Kingdom: Animalia
- Phylum: Chordata
- Class: Mammalia
- Order: Rodentia
- Family: Echimyidae
- Genus: Plagiodontia
- Species: †P. ipnaeum

Binomial name
- †Plagiodontia ipnaeum Johnson, 1948

Synonyms
- Plagiodontia velozi Rimoli, 1976

= Samaná hutia =

Extinct species of rodent

The Samaná hutia (Plagiodontia ipnaeum) is an extinct species of rodent in the subfamily Capromyinae. It was endemic to Hispaniola (the Dominican Republic and Haiti). Its natural habitat was subtropical or tropical moist lowland forests.

== History ==
The remains were found in association with those from rats of the genus Rattus, which suggests that the imposter hutia survived until the time of European colonization of the island, and may have gone extinct due to predation from introduced rodents. It is possible that the Samaná hutia represents the quemi, an animal purported to inhabit Hispaniola by Spanish colonist Gonzalo Fernández de Oviedo y Valdés from 1536 to 1546; it could also represent an animal called comadreja, which allegedly survived into the 20th century.
