= Frédéric Cuvier =

French zoologist and paleontologist (1773–1838)

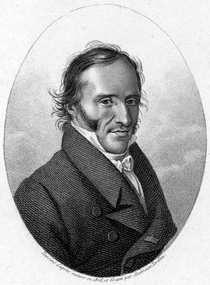
- Portrait by Ambroise Tardieu
- Born: 28 June 1773; Montbéliard, France
- Died: 24 July 1838 (aged 65); Strasbourg, France
- Awards: Member of the Royal Society
- Scientific career
- Fields: Zoology
- Workplaces: Muséum d'Histoire Naturelle
- Author abbrev. (botany): F.Cuvier
- Author abbrev. (zoology): F. Cuvier

Georges-Frédéric Cuvier (French pronunciation: [ʒɔʁʒ fʁedeʁik kyvje]; 28 June 1773 – 24 July 1838) was a French zoologist and paleontologist. He was the younger brother of noted naturalist and zoologist Georges Cuvier.

== Career ==
Frederic was the head keeper of the menagerie at the Muséum d'Histoire Naturelle in Paris from 1804 to 1838. He named the red panda (Ailurus fulgens) in 1825. The chair of comparative physiology was created for him at the Muséum d'Histoire Naturelle in 1837. He was elected as a foreign member of the Royal Society in 1835.

He is mentioned in Charles Darwin's On the Origin of Species (Chapter VII) as having worked on animal behaviour and instinct, especially the distinction between habit and instinct. He is also mentioned in Herman Melville's Moby-Dick (Chapter 32) as having written on the topic of whales.

== Evolution ==
Cuvier has been described as the first scientist to use terms "héréditaire" (hereditary) in 1807 and "heredity" in 1812 in their now biological context. He used both words in promoting the inheritance of acquired characteristics based on his studies of animal behaviour.

Although an advocate of the inheritance of acquired characteristics, similar to his brother he denied the transmutation of species. He believed that behavioral patterns in animals change over time in relation to environmentally induced needs. Historian Robert J. Richards has written that Cuvier "did not believe that the anatomical patterns of species were modified over time (though he did admit they changed in nonessential ways through the inheritance of acquired characteristics... He was a behavioral evolutionist, if a modest one."

== List of selected publications ==
Books

- Histoire naturelle des mammifères (4 vols., 1819–1842) (with Étienne Geoffroy Saint-Hilaire)
- De l’histoire naturelle des cétacés. Roret, Paris 1836
- Cuvier, Frédéric, ed. (1816–1845). Dictionnaire des sciences naturelles, dans lequel on traite méthodiquement des différens êtres de la nature, considérés soit en eux-mêmes, d'après l'état actuel de nos connoissances, soit relativement à l'utilité qu'en peuvent retirer la médecine, l'agriculture, le commerce et les artes. Suivi d'une biographie des plus célèbres naturalistes. 61 vols (in French). Paris: F. G. Levrault.
- Observations préliminaires, pp. i–xxiv in Recherches sur les ossemens fossiles, by G. Cuvier, ed. 4, vol. 1. E. d’Ocagne, Paris, 1834.

Papers

- Cuvier, F. (1808). Observations sur le chien des habitans de la Nouvelle-Hollande, précédés de quelques réflexions sur les facultés morales des animaux. Ann. Mus. Hist. Nat. 11: 458–476.
- Cuvier, F. (1812). Essais sur les facultés intellectuelles des brutes. Nouv. Bull. Sci. Soc. Philomat. 3: 217–218
