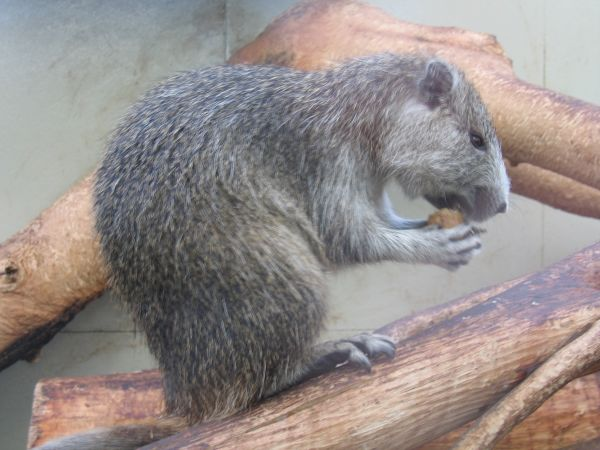
- Desmarest's hutia (Capromys pilorides)

Scientific classification
- Kingdom: Animalia
- Phylum: Chordata
- Class: Mammalia
- Infraclass: Placentalia
- Order: Rodentia
- Family: Echimyidae
- Subfamily: Capromyinae; Smith, 1842

Type genus
- Capromys Desmarest, 1822

Genera
- Tribe Capromyini: Capromys; Geocapromys; Mesocapromys; Mysateles; Tribe Plagiodontini: Plagiodontia; †Hyperplagiodontia; †Rhizoplagiodontia; †Tribe Hexolobodontini: †Hexolobodon; †Tribe Isolobodontini: †Isolobodon
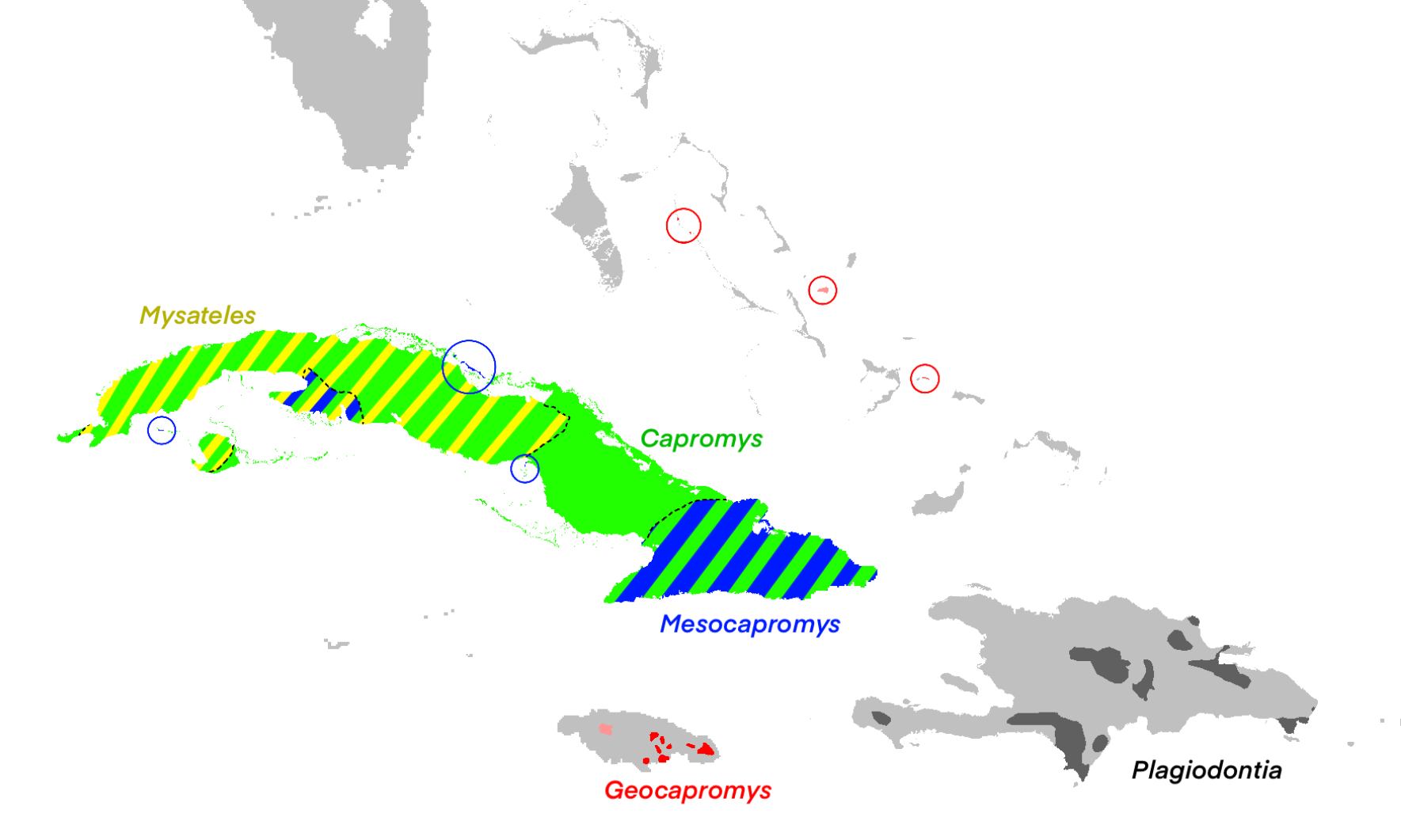

= Hutia =

Hutia Temporal range: Early Miocene–Recent

Rodents of the subfamily Capromyinae

Hutias (known in Spanish as jutía) are moderately large cavy-like rodents of the subfamily Capromyinae (from Ancient Greek κάπρος (kápros), meaning "pig, boar", and μῦς (mûs), meaning "mouse, rat") that inhabit the Caribbean islands. Most species are restricted to Cuba, but species are known from all of the Greater Antilles, as well as the Bahamas and (formerly) Little Swan Island off Honduras.

Twenty species of hutia have been identified, but at least half are extinct. Only Desmarest's hutia and the prehensile-tailed hutia remain common and widespread; all other extant species are considered threatened by the IUCN.

The extinct giant hutias of the family Heptaxodontidae also inhabited the Caribbean, but are not thought to be closely related, with the giant hutias belonging in the superfamily Chinchilloidea.

== Description ==
Most species have a head-and-body length that ranges from 21 to 46 cm (8.3 to 18.1 in) and weigh less than 2 kg (4.4 lb), but Desmarest's hutia has a head-and-body length of 31 to 60 cm (12 to 24 in) and weighs 2.8–8.5 kg (6.2–18.7 lb). They resemble the coypu in some respects. Tails are present, varying from vestiges to prehensile. They have stout bodies and large heads. Most species are herbivorous, though some consume small animals. Instead of burrowing underground, they nest in trees or rock crevices.

They are hunted for food in Cuba, where they are often cooked in a large pot with wild nuts and honey. At the Guantanamo Bay Naval Base however, there is an over population due to an abundant food source and the lack of natural predators. Desmarest's hutias are referred to by those stationed at the Guantanamo Bay Naval Base as banana rats. Banana rats are not named for their dietary preference, but because their feces look like small versions of the fruit. They are known to come out at night.

== Phylogeny ==
Molecular studies of phylogeny indicate that hutias nest within the Neotropical spiny rats (Echimyidae). Indeed, the hutia subfamily, Capromyinae, is the sister group to Owl's spiny rat Carterodon. In turn, this clade shares phylogenetic affinities with a subfamily of spiny rats, the Euryzygomatomyinae.

Within Capromyidae, the deepest split involves Plagiodontia with respect to other genera, followed by the divergence of Geocapromys. The latter genus is the sister group to a clade in which Capromys branches off before the Mesocapromys and Mysateles split.

Genus-level cladogram of the Capromyidae
with their relationship to Carterodon and Euryzygomatomyinae.

- Octodontoidea
  - Euryzygomatomyinae
    - Trinomys (Atlantic spiny rats)
    - - Clyomys
      - Euryzygomatomys (guiaras)
  - - Carterodon (Owl's spiny rat)
    - Capromyidae
      - Plagiodontini
        Plagiodontia
      - Capromyini
        - Geocapromys
        - - Capromys (Desmarest's hutia)
          - - Mesocapromys
            - Mysateles

The cladogram has been reconstructed from mitochondrial and nuclear DNA characters.

Hutias colonized the islands of the Caribbean as far as the Bahamas by oceanic dispersal from South America, reaching the Greater Antilles by the early Oligocene. This was facilitated by the direction of prevailing currents.

== Systematics ==
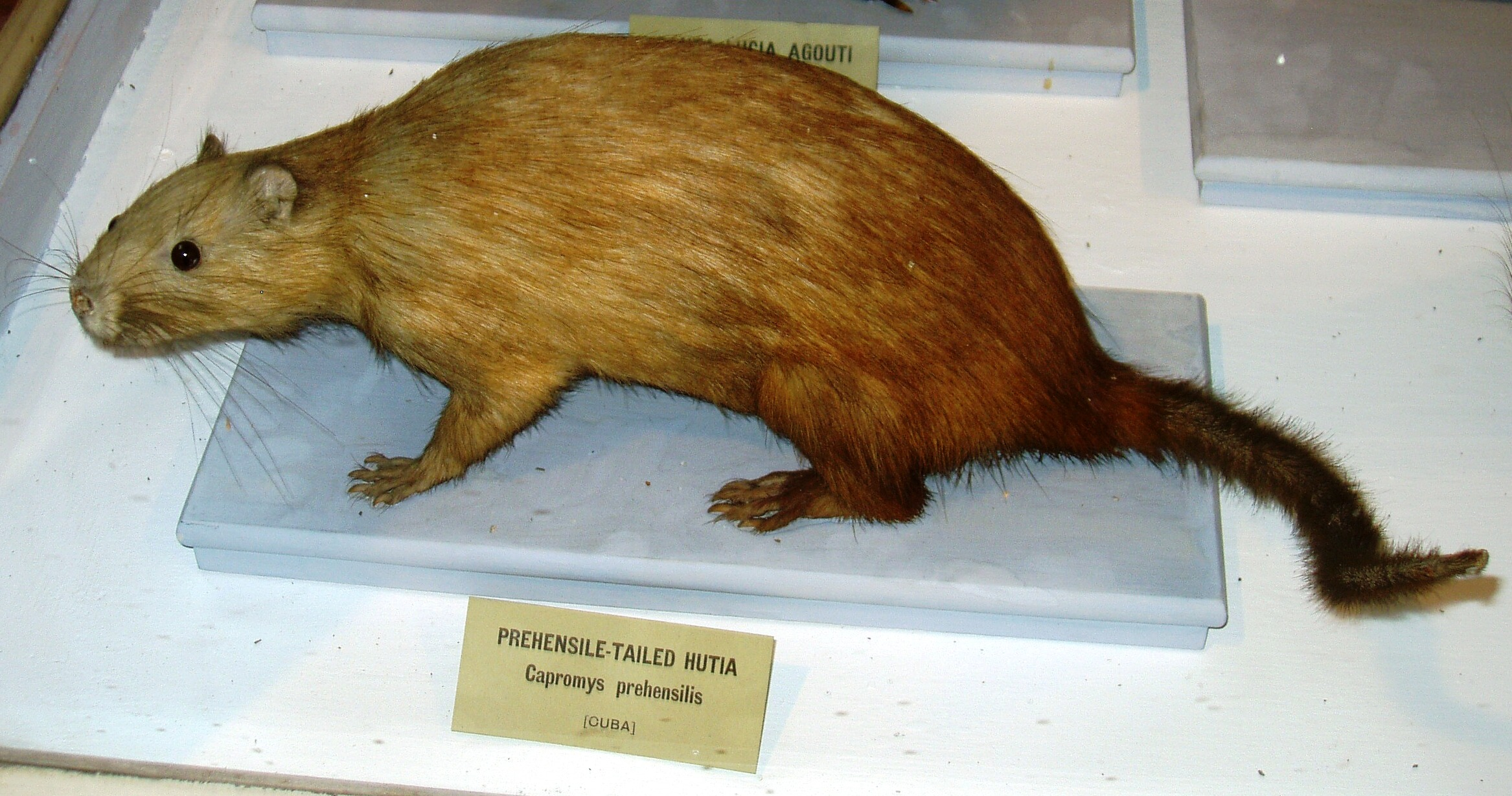
Prehensile-tailed hutia (Mysateles prehensilis)

The systematics of the 10 extant and 11 extinct recognized species of Capromyidae is as follows. Taxa known to be extinct are marked with a dagger (†).

Subfamily Capromyinae

Tribe Capromyini

Capromys

Garrido's hutia (Capromys garridoi) (possibly extinct)
Desmarest's hutia (Capromys pilorides)

Geocapromys

Jamaican hutia (Geocapromys brownii)
Bahamian hutia (Geocapromys ingrahami)
†Cayman hutia (Geocapromys caymanensis)
†Cuban coney (Geocapromys columbianus)
†Little Swan Island hutia (Geocapromys thoracatus)

Mesocapromys

Cabrera's hutia (Mesocapromys angelcabrerai)
Eared hutia (Mesocapromys auritus)
Black-tailed hutia (Mesocapromys melanurus)
Dwarf hutia (Mesocapromys nana) (possibly extinct)
San Felipe hutia (Mesocapromys sanfelipensis) (possibly extinct)

Mysateles

Prehensile-tailed hutia (Mysateles prehensilis)

Tribe †Hexolobodontini

†Hexolobodon

†Imposter hutia (Hexolobodon phenax)

Tribe Isolobodontini

†Isolobodon

†Montane hutia (Isolobodon montanus)
†Puerto Rican hutia (Isolobodon portoricensis)

Tribe Plagiodontini

Plagiodontia

Hispaniolan hutia (Plagiodontia aedium)
†Samaná hutia (Plagiodontia ipnaeum)
†Small Haitian hutia (Plagiodonta spelaeum)

†Hyperplagiodontia

†Wide-toothed hutia (Hyperplagiodontia araeum)

†Rhizoplagiodontia

†Lemke's hutia (Rhizoplagiodontia lemkei)

== Religious significance ==
In Santería, hutia powder (Spanish: jutía ahumada) is used as a ritual offering, especially to Elegua.
