= Autopista de la Isla de la Juventud =

Motorway in Cuba

Autopista de la Isla de la Juventud (Autopista Gerona-La Fe)
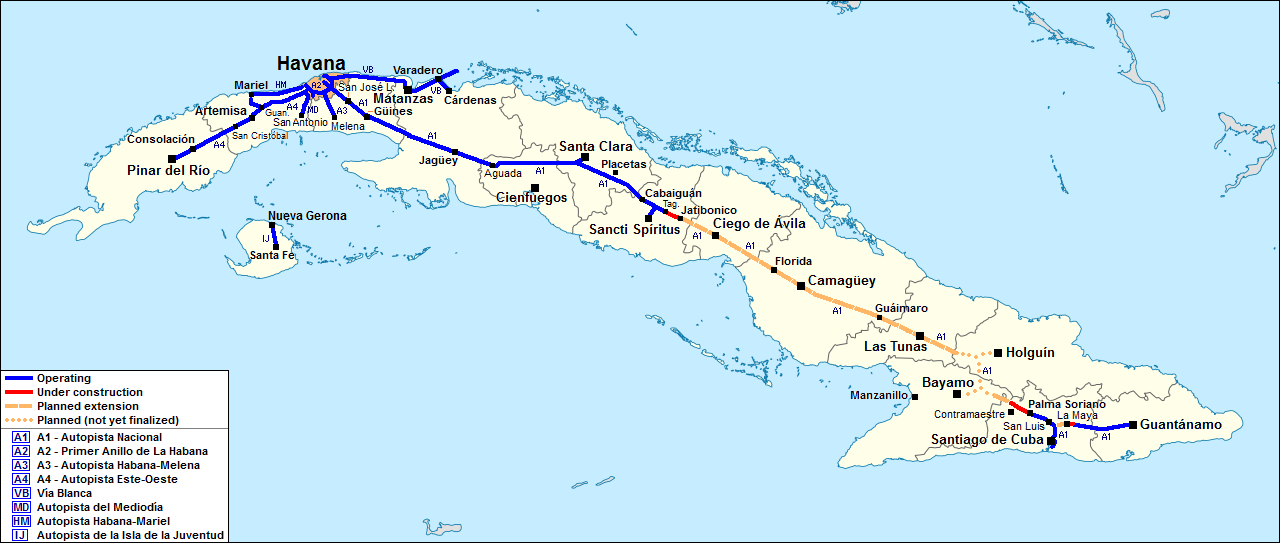
- Map of the Cuban motorway network

Route information
- Length: 15 km (9.3 mi)

Major junctions
- North end: Nueva Gerona
- South end: Santa Fe

Location
- Country: Cuba
- Major cities: Nueva Gerona, La Demajagua, Mariel

Highway system
- Roads in Cuba

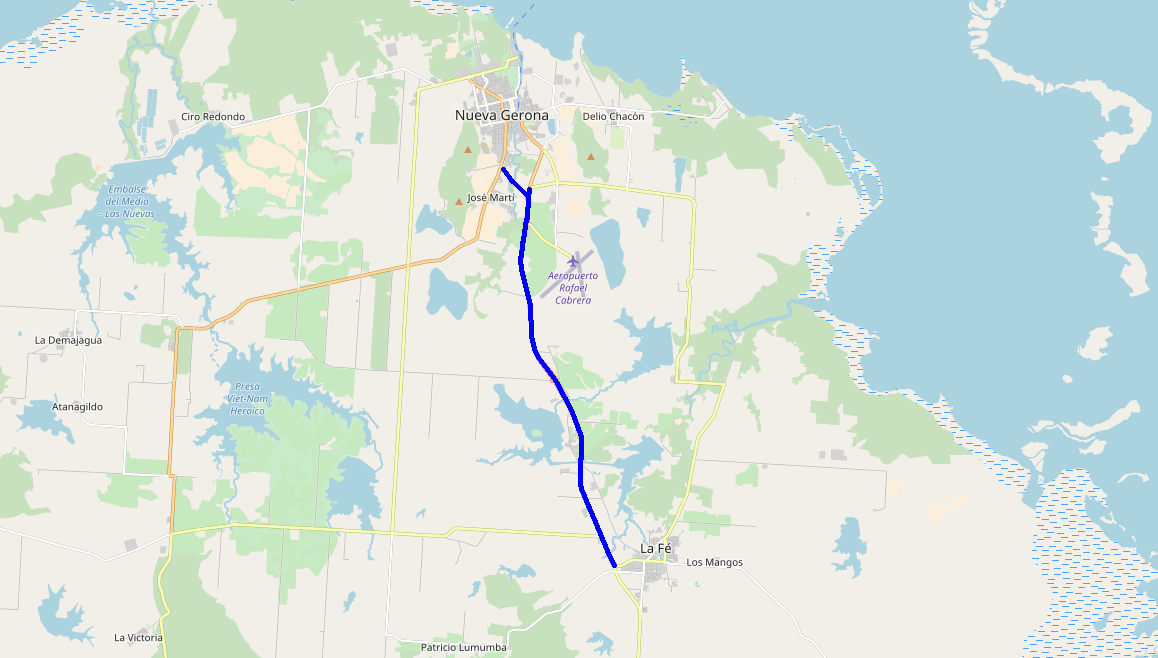
OSM map of the motorway (highlighted in blue) within the northern area of the Isle of Youth.

The Autopista de la Isla de la Juventud, also known as Autopista Gerona-La Fe, is a Cuban motorway linking Nueva Gerona to Santa Fe (also named La Fe), the principal settlements of the Isla de la Juventud (Isle of Youth). It is a toll-free road and, with a length of 15 km (9.3 mi), is the shortest Cuban motorway.

== Route ==
The motorway is a dual carriageway with 4 lanes and has some at-grade intersections with rural roads. It starts south of Nueva Gerona, from the provincial road "Carretera a Siguanea", between town's center and José Martí ward. After a km, the motorway intersects the east beltway and, after another km, it is an exit connectingt the autopista with Rafael Cabrera Mustelier Airport, 2 km far. The other exits along the route are, in many cases, far from the villages, as the one serving La Demajagua (20 km west). The motorway ends northwest of Santa Fe, where it is divided into a pair of provincial road: one crosses the town in the middle, the other goes close to the western suburb.

AUTOPISTA DE LA ISLA DE LA JUVENTUD (Autopista Gerona-La Fe)
Exit	↓km↓	Province	Note
Nueva Gerona José Martí ( road to the ferries to Surgidero, Cuban mainland)	0.0	Isla de la Juventud	
Nueva Gerona Circunvalación (Universidad - Presidio Modelo)	1.3	Isla de la Juventud	
Nueva Gerona Aeropuerto	2.2	Isla de la Juventud	
La Demajagua-Atanagildo (Presa Vietnam Heróico)	8.2	Isla de la Juventud	
Mal País	10.7	Isla de la Juventud	
La Victoria-Patricio Lumumba	14.1	Isla de la Juventud	
Santa Fe (La Fe)	15.1	Isla de la Juventud	

== See also ==
- Roads in Cuba
- Transport in Cuba
- Infrastructure of Cuba
