= Canarreos Archipelago =

Archipelago of Cuba

Location of Canarreos Archipelago in Cuba

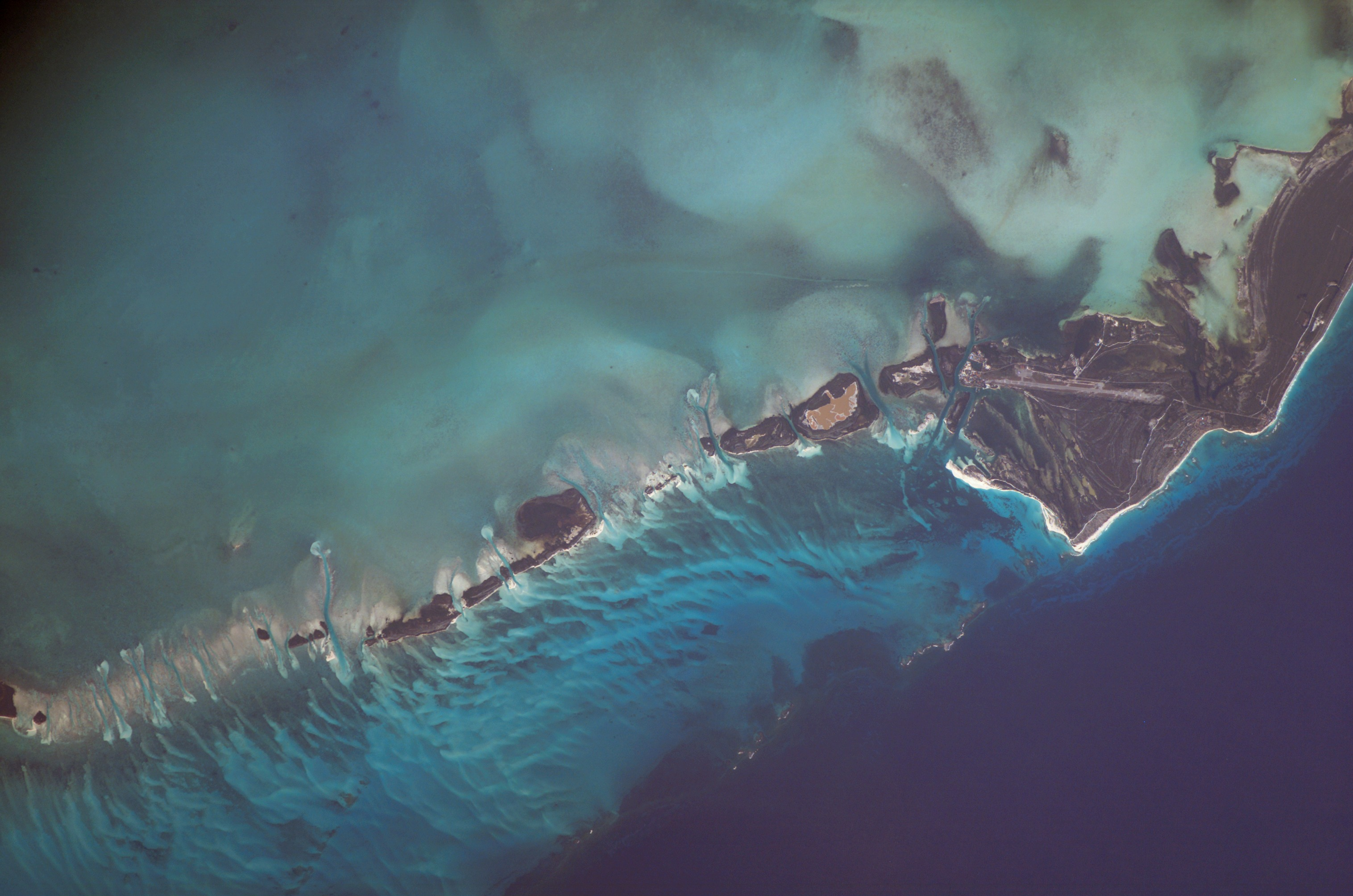
Photo of the archipelago, from Cayo Largo (on the far right, albeit cut off) to Cayo Peraza, taken by International Space Station Expedition 16

The Canarreos Archipelago (Spanish: Archipiélago de los Canarreos) is an archipelago off the southwestern coast of the main island of Cuba. Of its approximately 350 islands and islets, only the largest two—Isla de la Juventud and Cayo Largo del Sur—have been developed, leaving the rest's "mangrove forests, seagrass beds, coral reefs, and coastal wetlands" unspoiled, thus providing habitats, breeding sites and migratory stops for many species.

== Geography ==
It is located southwest of the main island of Cuba in the Caribbean Sea about 110 miles (180 km) from Havana. It is bordered to the east by the Gulf of Cazones and to the north by the Gulf of Batabanó.

It comprises roughly 350 islands and islets, and is almost as long as the Florida Keys. By far the largest island of the archipelago is Isla de la Juventud, with an area of 2,200 square kilometres (850 sq mi), while the second largest is Cayo Largo del Sur, covering 37 square kilometres (14 sq mi). The latter is the largest sand cay in the Caribbean, with 16 miles (26 km) of sandy beaches.

== Climate ==
The climate is tropical, with the wet season running from May to October. Temperatures range, on average, from 24 to 31 °C (75 to 88 °F).

== Economic activity ==
Both Isla de la Juventud and Cayo Largo del Sur have tourist resorts and an airport. While the former has a permanent population, the latter does not; hotel employees work for about 20 days, then return to their homes on nearby islands. Outside of these two islands, the infrastructure is kept limited to protect the environment.

== Conservation ==
The archipelago is an important breeding area for several turtle species. A 2001 survey found 791 green sea turtle nesting sites on Cayo Largo del Sur, while the loggerhead sea turtle preferred the Guanal beach on Isla de la Juventud.

The Cuban greater funnel-eared bat was thought to have gone extinct, but a population was discovered in 1992 in a single cave on Isla de la Juventud. Sphaerodactylus storeyae, a gecko species, is known from only two localities on the same island.

The range of Garrido's hutia, a small, possibly extinct, ratlike mammal, is believed to be the archipelago; the 1992 Guinness Book of Records states that it and the earth hutia (C. sanfelipensis) are the rarest rodents in the world.

In 1996, Cayo Largo del Sur was designated a "Zone under Special Regime of Use and Protection" by the Cuban Ministry of Fisheries. The entire archipelago, together with its neighboring archipelago Jardines de la Reina and the Zapata Swamp Natural Reserve have been proposed for the designation World Natural Heritage Site.

== List of major islands ==
Island	Capital	Other cities	Area (km²) (Census 2012)	Population (Census 2012)	
Cayo Aguardiente	Aguardiente	Punta del Canto	6.50	0	
Cayo Alacranes	Cayo Alcaranes	Cayo Redondo, Cayo Alcatraces, Cayo Campito, Cayo Canal Rica, Cayo La Rica, Cayo Botija	11.13	0	
Cayo Alcatraz	Cayo Alcatraz		3.06	0	
Cayo Avalos	Cayo Avalos		1.60	0	
Cayo Bocas de Alonso	Cayo San Juan	Cayo Sur, Cayo Matitas, Cayo Palma, Cayo Coco, Cayo Rabihorcado, Cayo los Cayuelos	47.05	0	
Cayo Campos	Playa de los Monos		12.00	2	
Cayo Cantiles	East Point Station	Punta Los Muertos, Punta del Ingles, Punta el Captivo, Punta Ciprey	33.70	3	
Cayo del Rosario	Playa Sirenas	Punta Mogote	22.00	0	
Cayo Iguana	Cayo Iguana		1.67	1	
Cayo Largo del Sur	Marina Largo	Vilo Acuna, Las Piedras, Punta Gancho, Punta Mangle Prieto, Punta Iguanita, Punta del Este, Playa Tortuga, Playa los Cocos, Playa Blanca, Playa Lindamar, Playa Paraiso, Playa Sirena, Playa Luna	37.50	24	
Cayo Rico	Rico Restaurant		1.10	0	
Cayos de Dios	Cayo Inglés	Cayo de Dios, Cayo Trabuco, Cayo Guano, Cayo Arenoso	0.65	0	
Cayos de la Manteca	Cayo Manteca	Cayo Grande, Cayo Norte Manteca	9.97	0	
Cayos del Hambre	Cayo Hambre grande	Cayo La Grifa, Cayo Hambre Chica, Cayo Segundo, Cayo Rabihorcado	4.76	0	
Isla de la Juventud	Nueva Gerona	Santa Fe, La Demajagua (Santa Bárbara), Columbia, Mac Kinley, Cuchilla Alta, Punta del Este, Sierra de Caballos, Sierra de Casas	2200.00	99970	
Mangles Island	Playa Este	Playa Oeste	2.19	0	
Other islands	Cayos los Indios	de san felipe, Tablones, del pasaje, Divisa, Perases, traviesa, Balandras, Guayabo, Triangulo, El Navio, Los Inglesitos, Quitasol	42.60	0	
	Canarreos Archipelago	Nueva Gerona	Santa Fe	2438.00	100000

== See also ==
- Geography of Cuba
- List of Caribbean islands
