= Garrido's hutia =

Conservation status
- Critically endangered, possibly extinct (IUCN 3.1)

Scientific classification
- Kingdom: Animalia
- Phylum: Chordata
- Class: Mammalia
- Order: Rodentia
- Family: Echimyidae
- Genus: Capromys
- Species: C. garridoi

Binomial name
- Capromys garridoi (Varona, 1970)
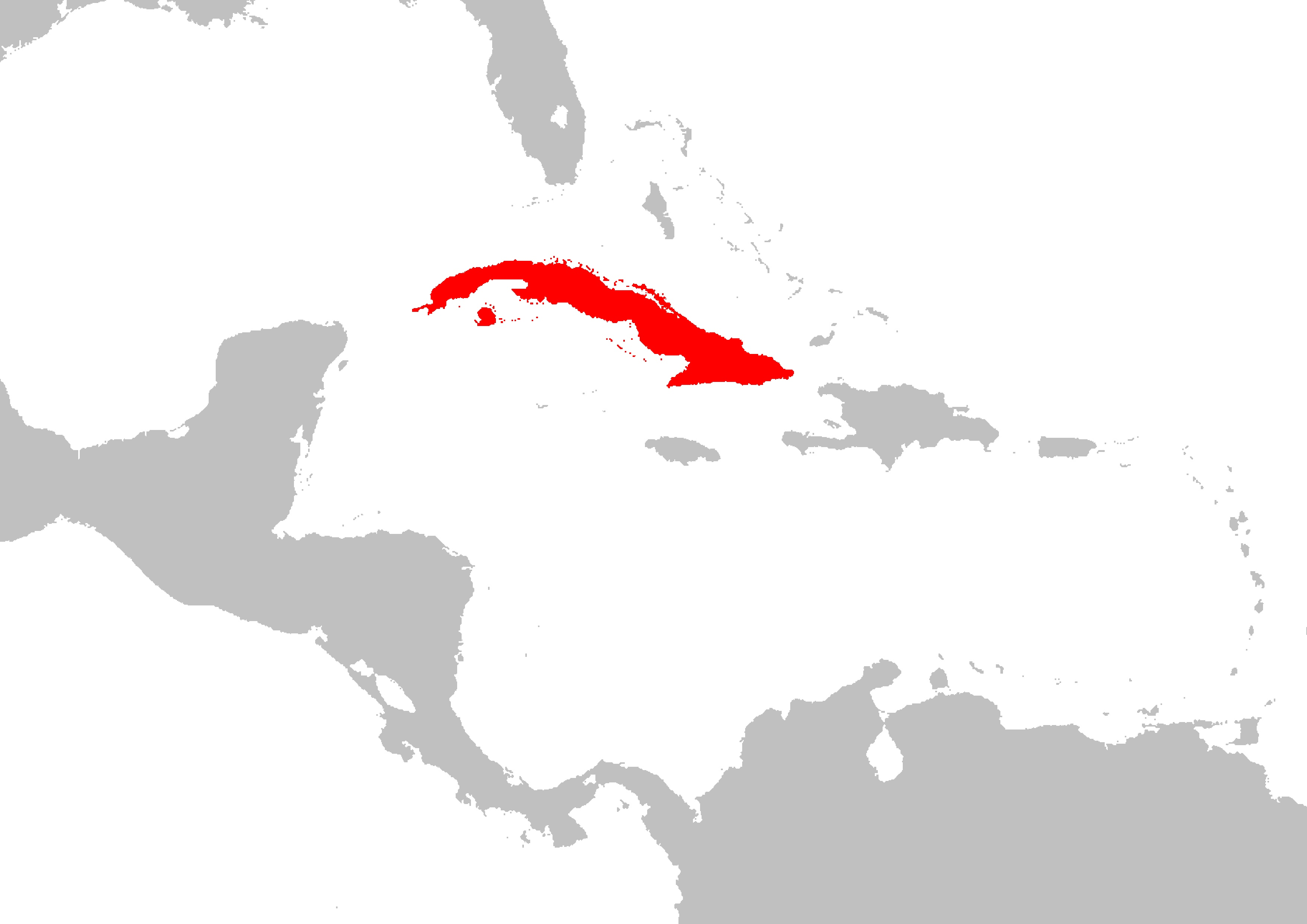

Synonyms
- Mysateles garridoi

Species of rodent

Garrido's hutia (Capromys garridoi) is a small, critically endangered, rat-like mammal found in coastal mangrove forests on Cuba and nearby islands. It is rarely seen and may be extinct. It is a member of the hutia subfamily (Capromyinae), a group of rodents native to the Caribbean that are mostly endangered or extinct. The only other species in its genus, the Desmarest's hutia (Capromys pilorides), is also found only on Cuba.

== Taxonomy ==
It was formerly classified in the genus Mysateles, but phylogenetic analysis supports it belonging to the genus Capromys, of which the only other member is the Desmarest's hutia (C. pilorides). It is not known if the species is truly distinct from C. pilorides; some authors have interpreted it as a misidentified specimen of it, but others consider it a distinct species based on cranial morphometric analysis. The American Society of Mammalogists tentatively recognizes it as a distinct species.

== Habitat and conservation ==
The Garrido's hutia lives in Cuban mangrove forests, part of the biodiverse Cuban moist forests ecoregion (listed on the Global 200). (Note: As part of the Greater Antillean moist forests ecoregion) Its range is thought to include small islands in the Banco de los Jardins y Jardinillos of Canarreos Archipelago south of Cuba's Zapata Peninsula and east of the Isle of Youth. A single animal was collected around 1970 on Cayos Maja off of south-central Cuba. In 1989, two additional animals were captured alive in keys near Cayos Maja.
