= Cuban mangroves =

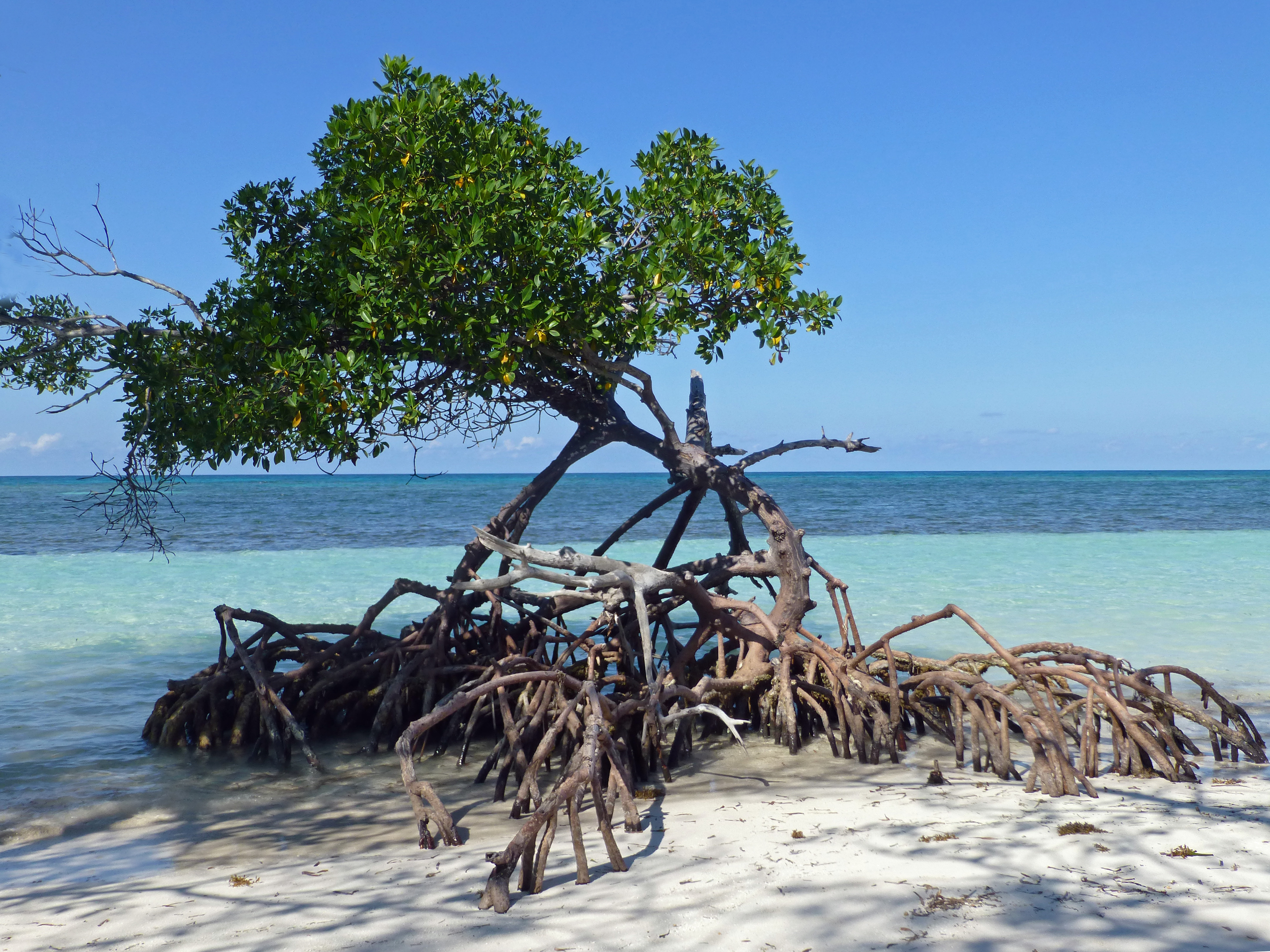
Mangrove tree in Cayo Jutías, Pinar del Río Province, Cuba.

Because Cuba is an archipelago made up by about 4,197 islands (including the two largest: Cuba proper, and Isla de la Juventud), the combined area of coast results in 5,746 square kilometers (3570.4 square miles); most of it (2,200 square miles or 5,967 square kilometers) being covered by mangrove forest. These mangrove forests make up 20 percent of the forested areas in the island, covering a total of 4.8 percent of the territory.

== Flora ==
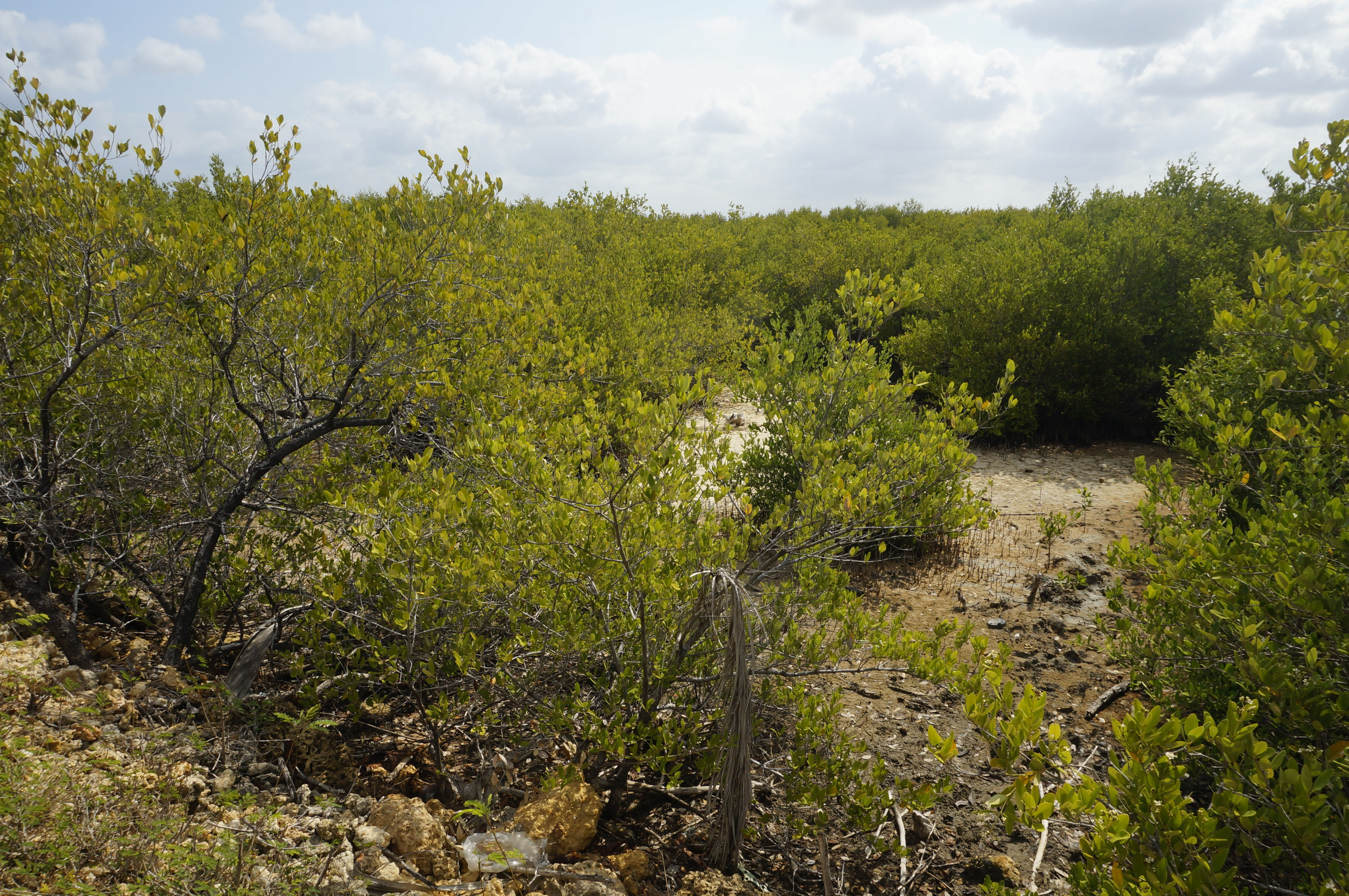
Mangrove forest in Peninsula Ancón, Sancti Spiritus province, Cuba

Cuban mangrove forests' top layer is made up of 4 tree species: Rhizophora mangle (red mangrove), Avicennia germinans (black mangrove), Laguncularia racemosa (white mangrove) and Conocarpus erectus (button mangrove). Depending on several factors, including water salinity, fresh water flow, coast shape and water depth, the size and distribution of those 4 species can differ. In some places, a mono-forest (made up by just one species) is found; in other places, all 4 species occur naturally. Sizes vary from very tall forests with a canopy at 15 meters (49.21 feet) of altitude, or as small as shrubs no taller than 2 meters (6.56 feet).

The mangrove forest is also home to many other botanical species; they are usually identified as “associated species”. The most predominant are Thespesia populnea (portia tree), Hibiscus tiliaceus (sea hibiscus), Bontia daphnoides (sea olive), Haematoxylum campechianum (Bloodwood), Bravaisia tubiflora (hulube), Dalbergia ecastophyllum (dalbergia) and several species of trees from the Leucaena genera. Depending on the salinity, some areas in the forest may be formed by understory species adapted to high levels of salt, such as Acrostichum aureum (golden leather fern), and Batis maritima (saltwort)

Among the branches of the larger trees live a large amount of epiphyte plants of the Tillandsia genera - usually called by their Taino name curujeyes in Cuba and the rest of the Caribbean islands, and referred as bromeliads in English - as well as many types of orchids from the Encyclia, Tolumnia, and Vanilla genera.

== Fauna ==
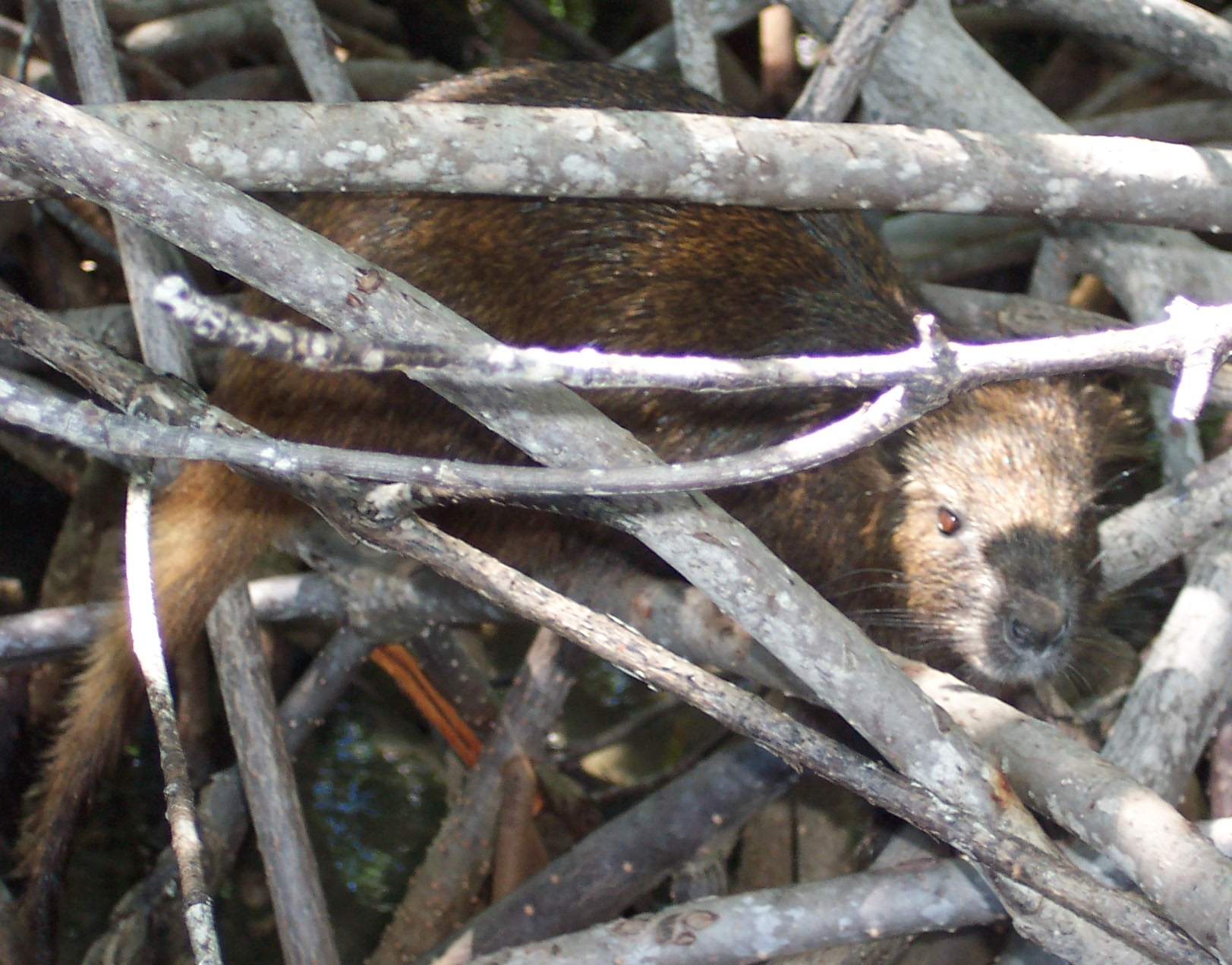
Desmarest's hutia shelters in thick mangroves near Morón

Cuban mangroves are well known spots for many migratory and endemic species of birds, as well as many fish, sponges, crustaceans and mollusks. Cuban mangroves are also the home of choice of the endemic Cuban crocodile (Crocodylus rhombifer), Cuban rock iguana (Cyclura nubila), and the Cuban hutias (Capromys family).

A complete list of all botanical and animal species associated with a Cuban mangrove forest is described in the paper “Ecosistemas de Manglar en el Archipiélago Cubano" by Leda Menéndez Carrera and José M. Guzmán Menéndez, edited and distributed by the Cuban Science Academy and UNESCO.

== Economy ==
Historically speaking, mangroves were a key factor in the development of the aboriginal cultures that populated Cuba before the arrival of the Spanish conquistadors. Aboriginal communities established first on maritime coast around mangrove areas where the sea and rivers meet. For centuries those types of locations would provide them with a rich source of sustenance.

Later on, during colonial and Republican times, mangroves were put to commercial use. Over 400 years of heavy harvesting put pressure on the ecosystem. Either used as textile dyes, tannin for pharmaceutical industries, lumber for furniture, charcoal, even as a popular wine flavoring.

== Conservation ==
A special blow to the well-being of the mangrove forests was executed in the 1960s, when the current government came to power. At the moment, the Cuban authorities realized the supply of fresh water for the increasing Cuban population had to be solved one way or another. As a tropical nation, Cuba has only two seasons: wet and dry. Over the rainy season, the island is constantly battered by hurricanes, as opposed to the 5 to 6 months of dry season, bringing heavy drought. In order to solve those issues, over 969 reservoirs were created, therefore reducing the fresh water flow that keeps mangroves healthy on the coastline.

The reservoir construction policy has claimed half a century later an unforeseen victim: mangroves. In some places of the island, such as in Batabanó, these ecosystems have been critically severed, and as a result hundreds of kilometers of coast that were arable or populated have been claimed by rising sea levels, especially during storm season, proving that what was believed to be a solution, has become instead a huge problem.

The Cuban government has attempted to mitigate this issue by quickly enforcing new conservation laws in order to correct the issues that mangroves and other inland ecosystems have suffered. In 2013, environmental authorities started a program in order to defend and recover the first line of defense against advancing waters and effects of salinization of farmlands, as well as attempting to fix their mangrove forests.

A moratorium on mangrove foresting was declared and ways to reforest and restore fresh water intake have been designed.

Even with the negative impacts from 500 years of environmentally irresponsible actions, Cuban mangroves are still the most conserved in the Caribbean, making up 69 percent of this region's coastal forests, as well as being the most well preserved. Even if areas around the former province of Havana (now the provinces of Artemisa and Mayabeque) are critical, mangrove coverage in other areas like Ciénaga de Zapata, Jardines de la Reina and Jardines del Rey has improved.

== Gallery ==
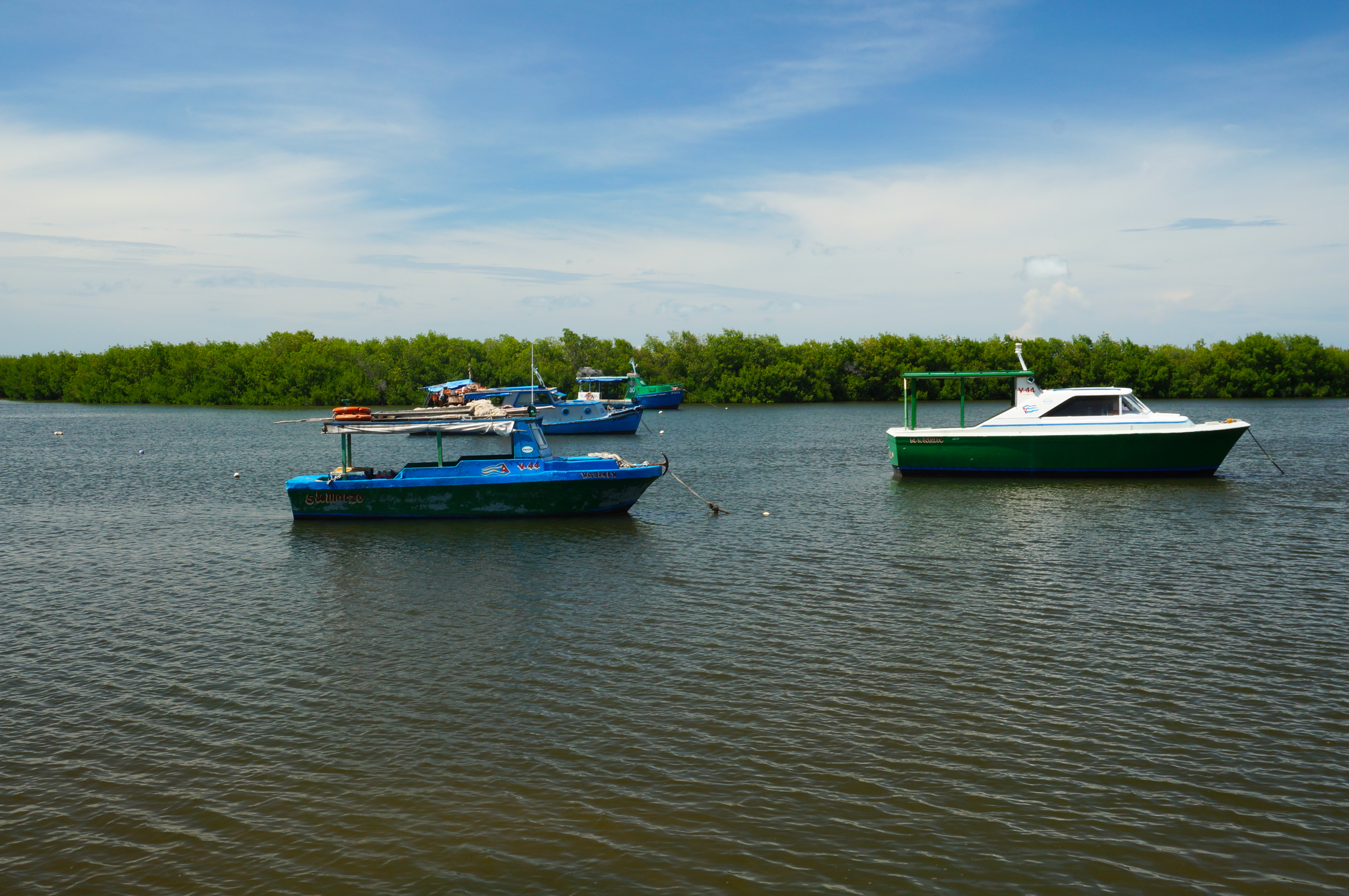
A lagoon surrounded by a mangrove forest used by a fishing community in Caibarién, Villa Clara Province, Cuba

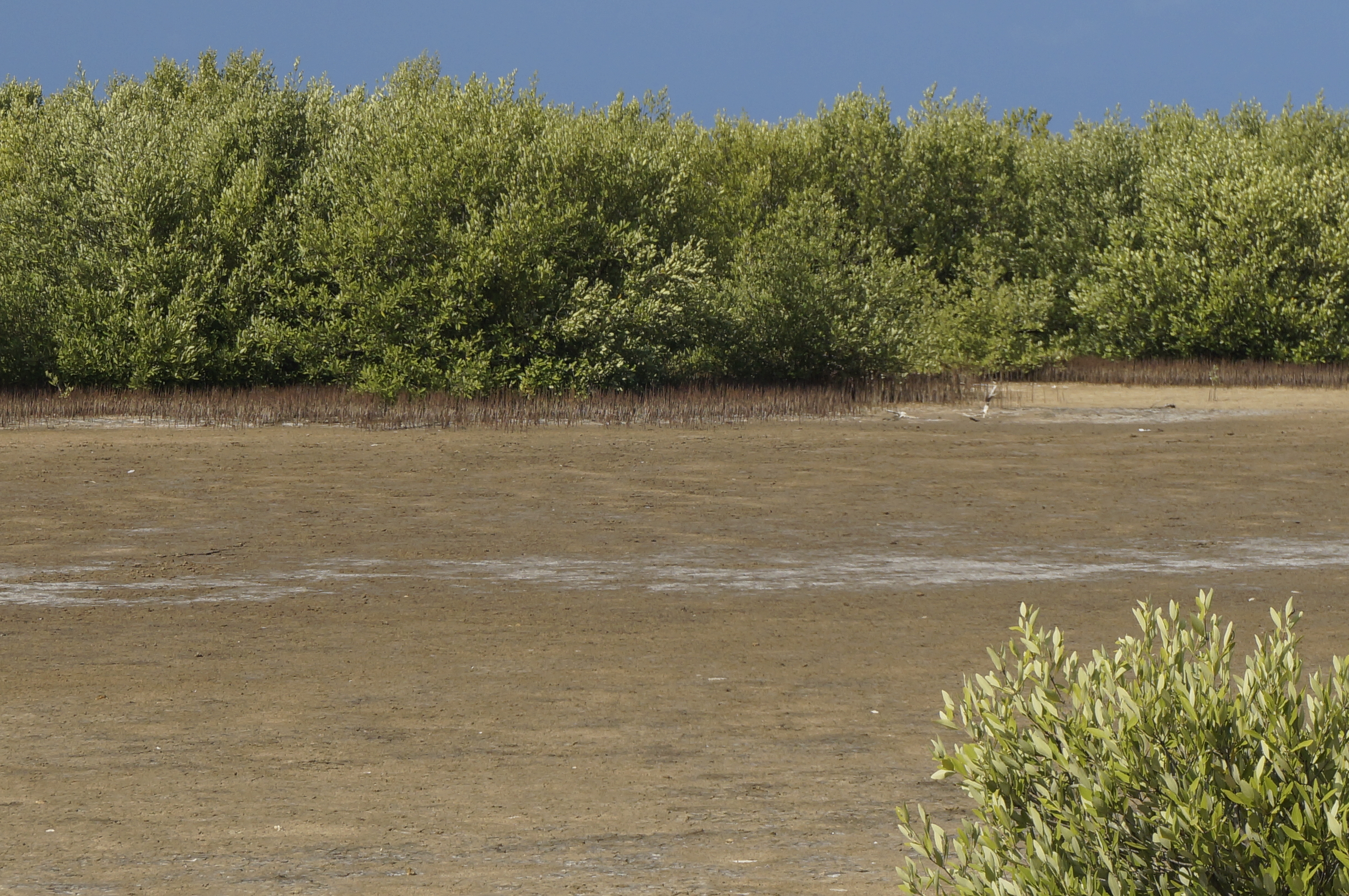
Mangrove forest in a dry lagoon near Casilda Port, Sancti Spiritus Province, Cuba

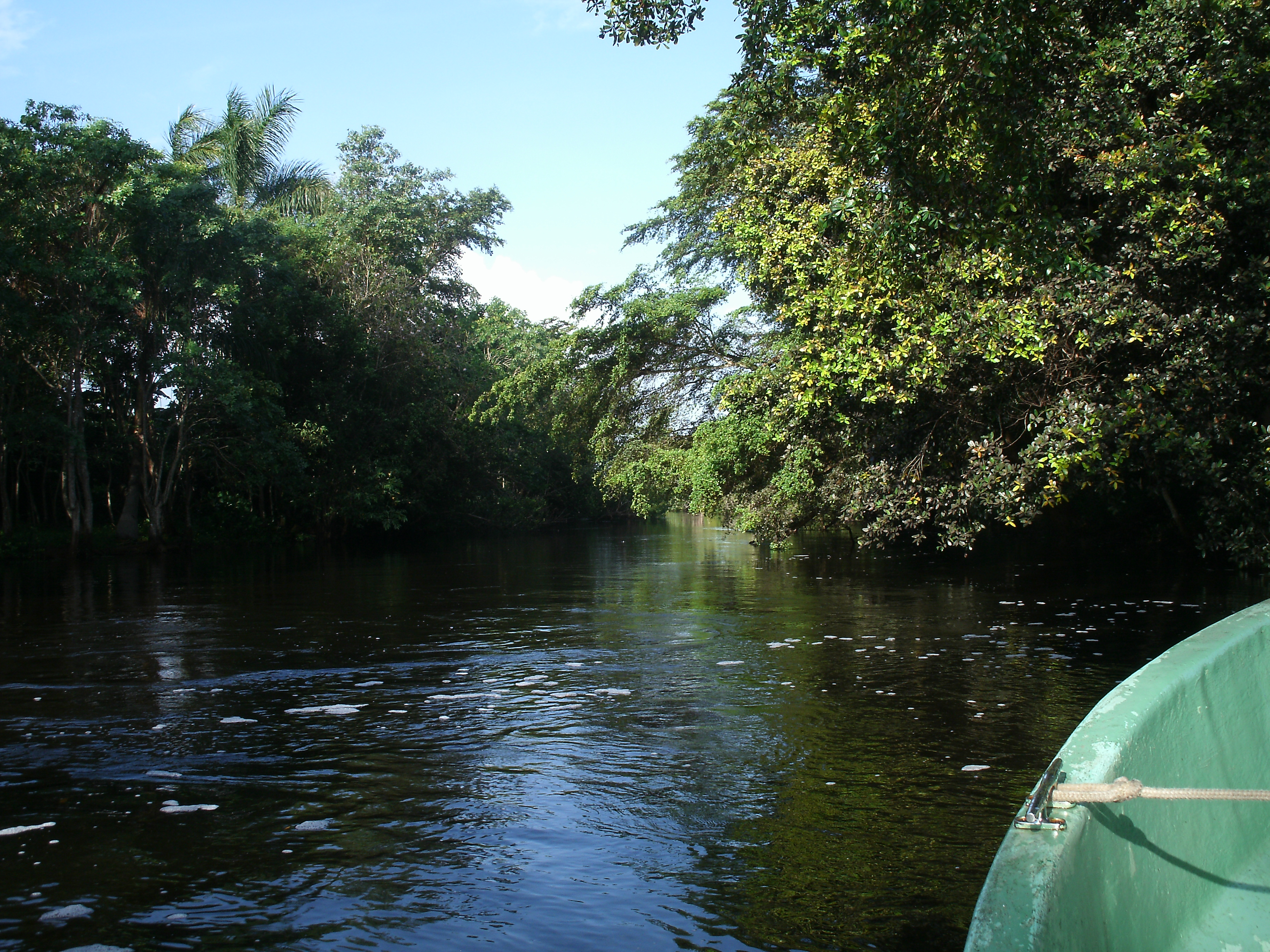
Mangrove forest along Hatiguanico river in the Zapata Swamp, province of Matanzas.

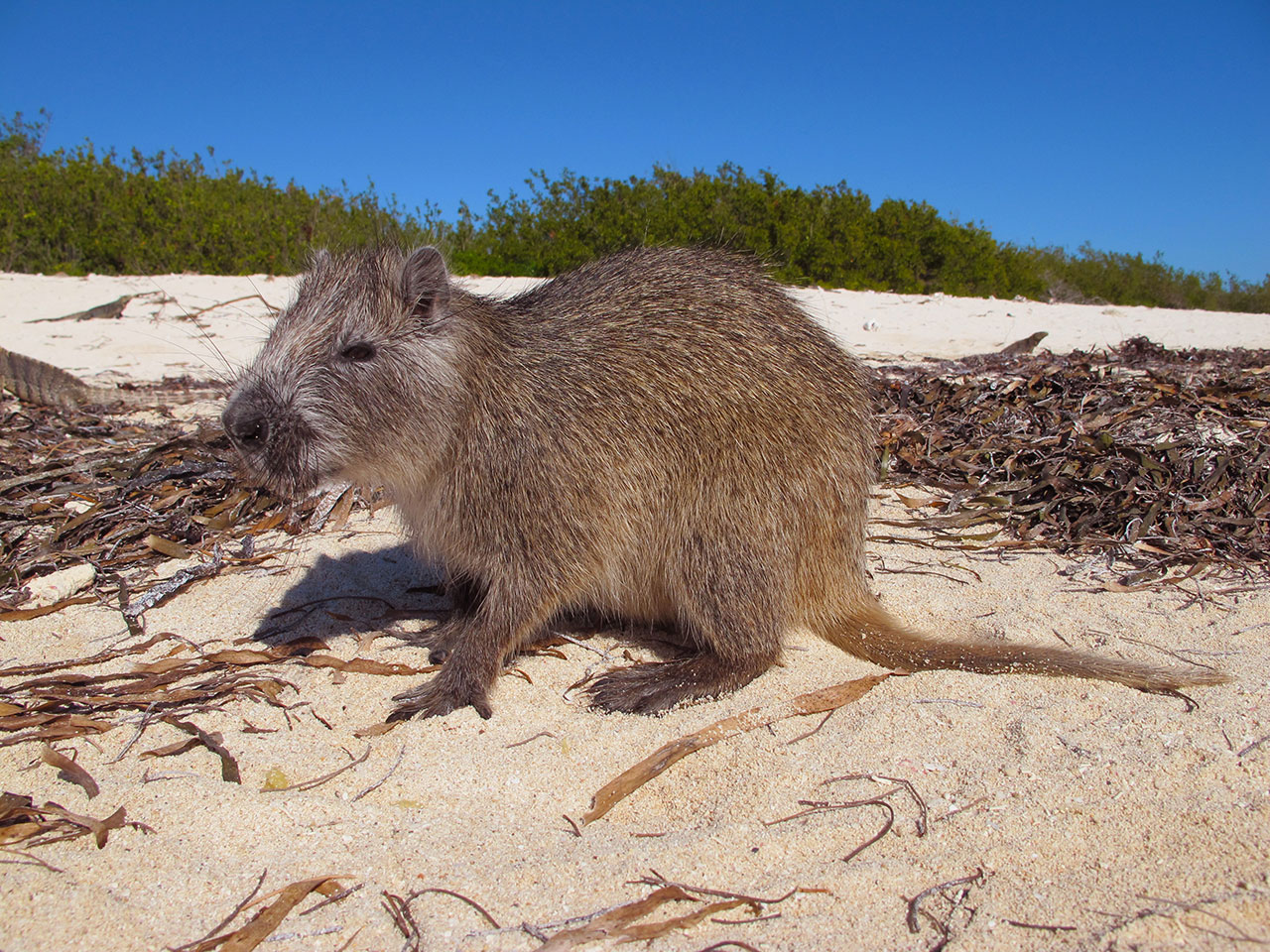
Desmarest's hutia in its natural habitat.

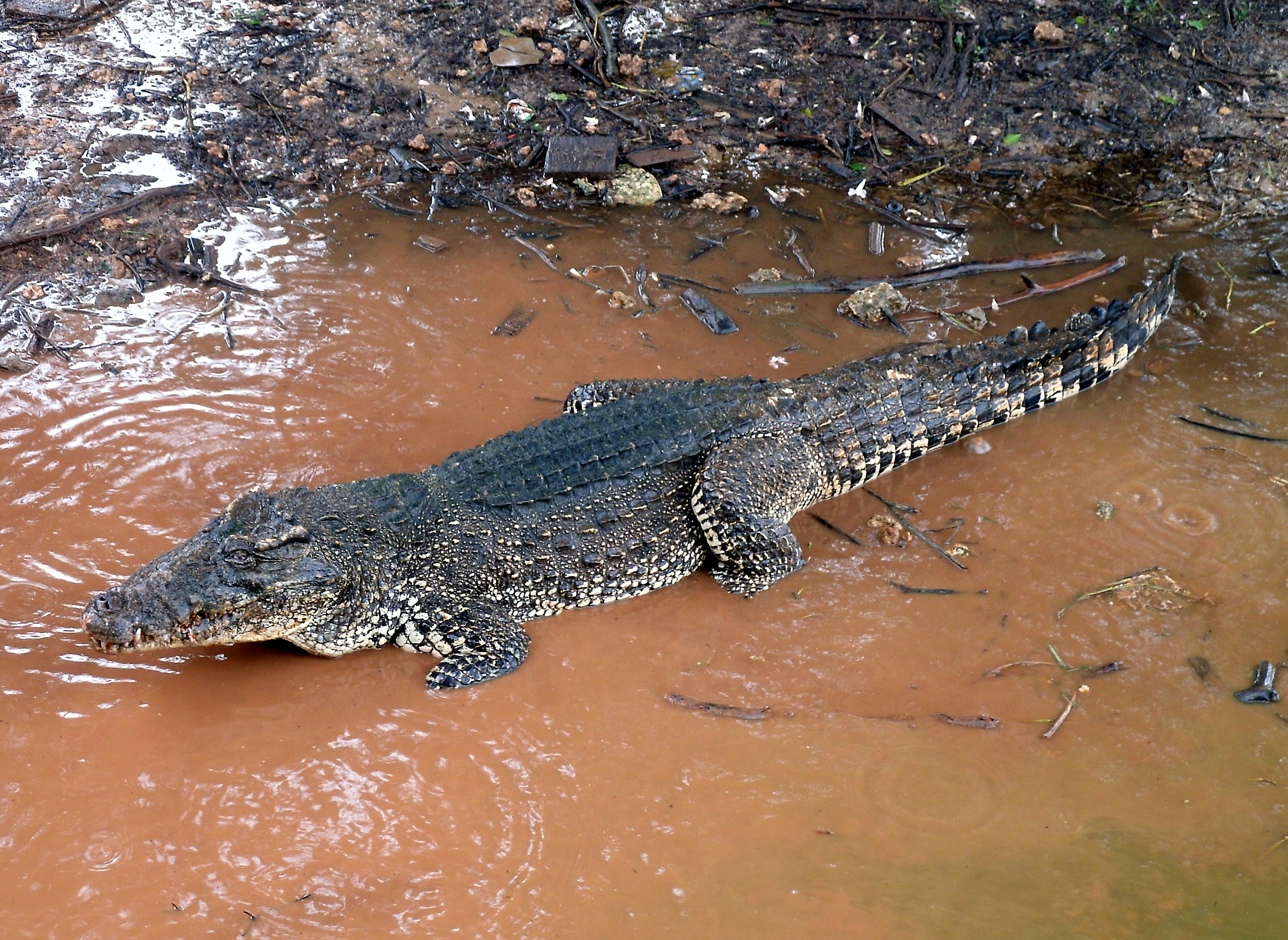
Cuban crocodile in Zapata.

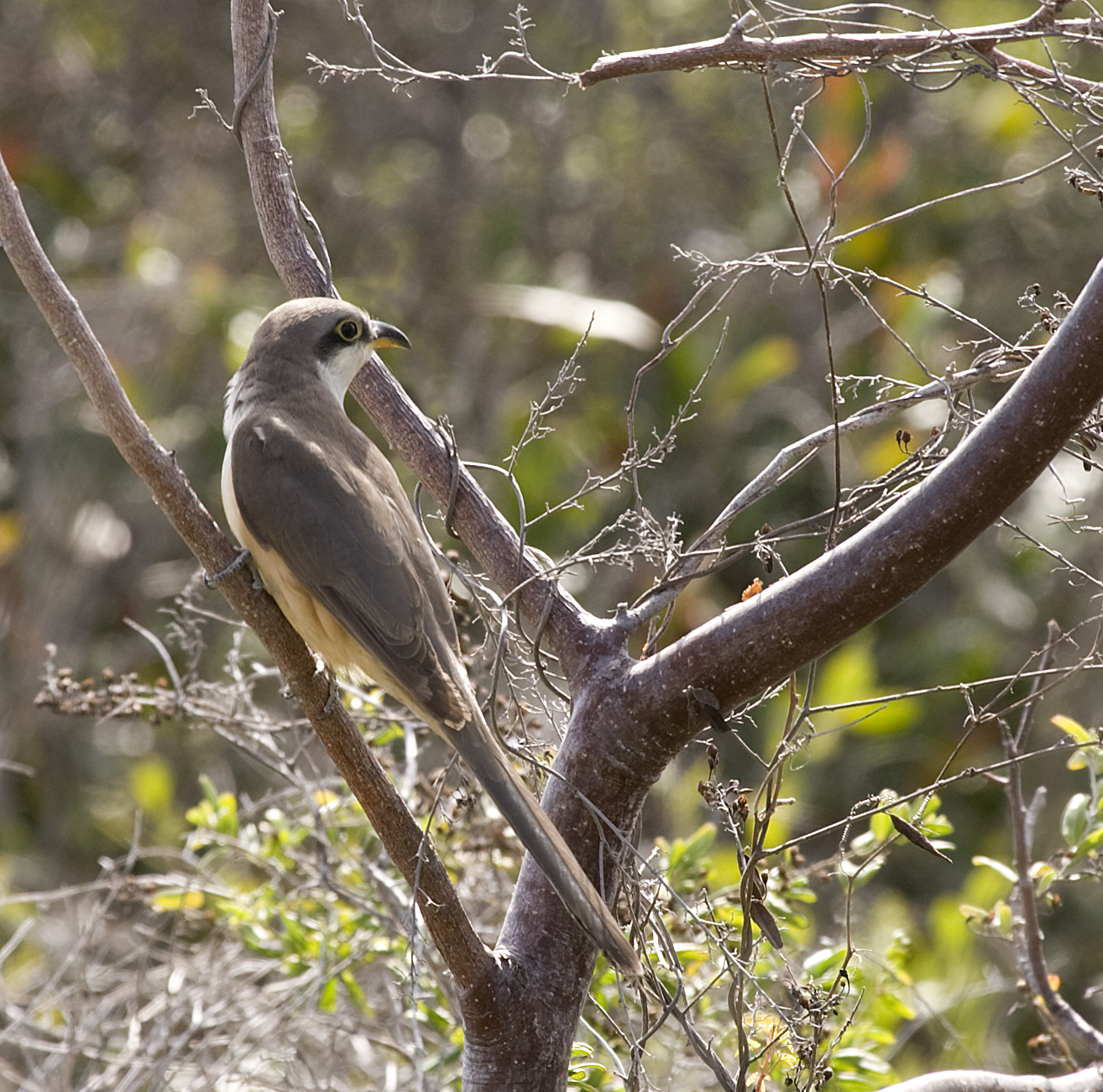
A mangrove cuckoo in Cuba.

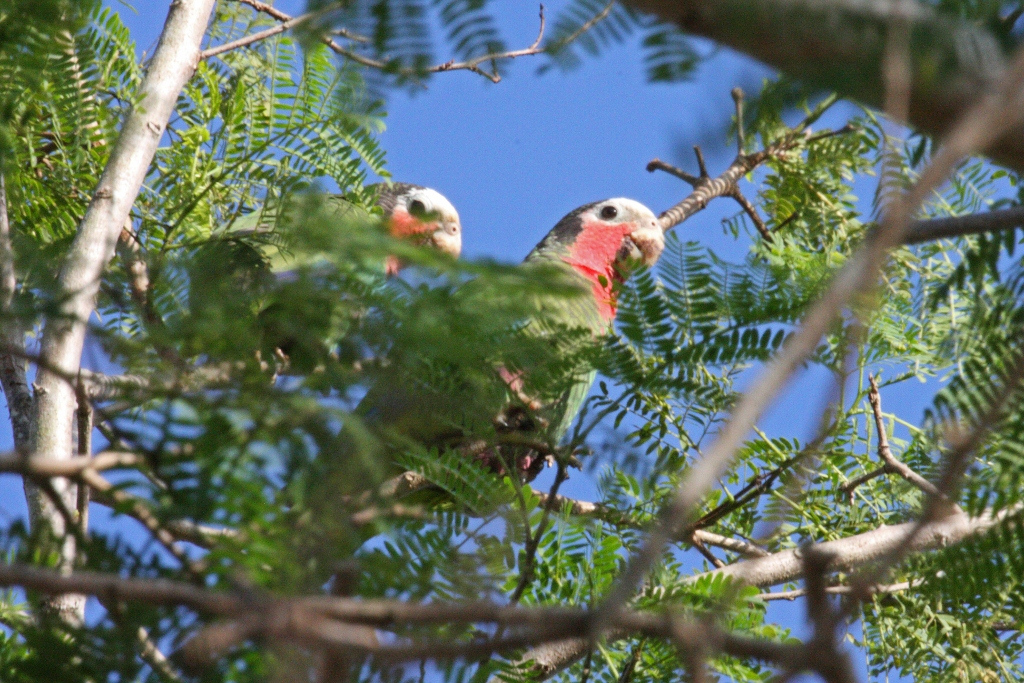
Cuban amazon
