= La Demajagua, Isle of Youth =

La Demajagua (Santa Bárbara)
- Village
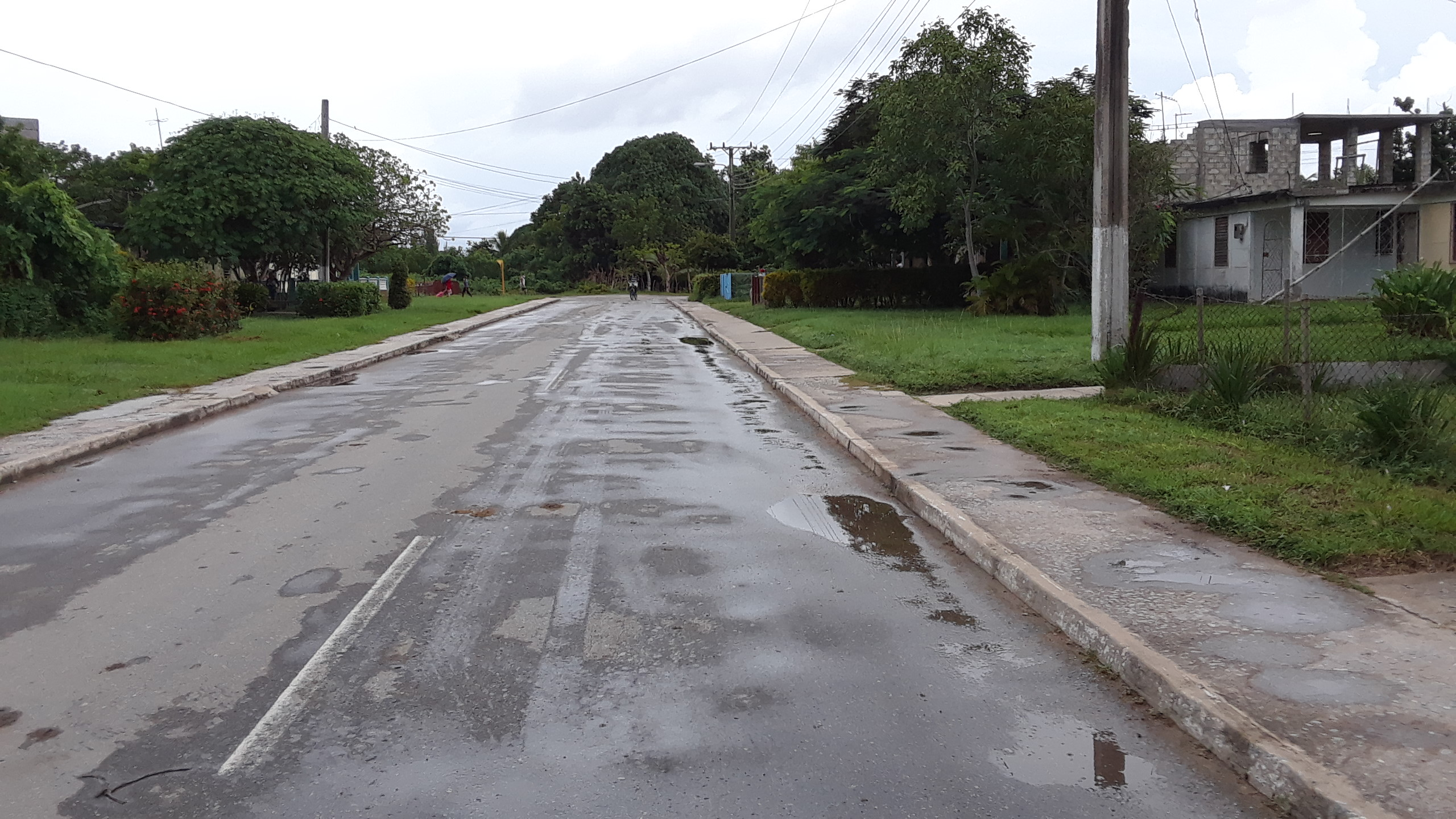
- La Demajagua street

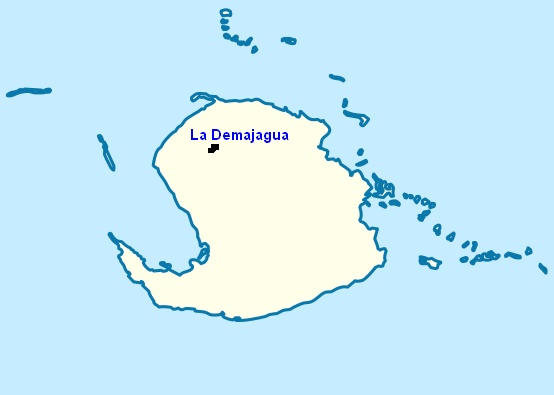
- Locator map of La Demajagua (in black) within Isla de la Juventud

- Location of La Demajagua in Cuba
- Coordinates: 21°48′51.8″N 82°57′23.76″W
- Country: Cuba
- Province: Isla de la Juventud
- Municipality: Isla de la Juventud (seat: Nueva Gerona)
- Founded: 1760
- Renamed: 1968
- Elevation: 20 m (66 ft)
- Time zone: UTC-5 (EST)

La Demajagua is a Cuban village and consejo popular ("people's council", i.e. hamlet) of the special municipality and province of Isla de la Juventud. It is the third most populated place of the island.

== History ==
Founded in 1760 with the name of Santa Bárbara, the modern settlement was renamed La Demajagua on 11 December 1968. It was so named after the sugar mill "La Demajagua", near Manzanillo, in which Carlos Manuel de Céspedes issued his cry of independence, the "10th of October Manifesto", in 1868.

== Geography ==
La Demajagua is located in the northwestern area of the island, nearby the road from Nueva Gerona to Siguanea Airport, and close to the lakes Presa Cristal and Presa Vietnam Heroico. It is 20 km far from Nueva Gerona, 30 from Santa Fe and 14 from its closest beach, Playa Buenavista, by the Gulf of Batabanó. The village is composed by 6 circumscriptions (76, 77, 78, 79, 80, 81).

== See also ==
- List of cities in Cuba
- Municipalities of Cuba
