= Tomás Aldazabal =

Cuban volleyball player (born 1976)

Personal information
- Born: 30 May 1976 (age 50) Santa Fe, Cuba
- Height: 1.93 m (6 ft 4 in)

Volleyball information
- Position: Outside hitter

National team
- Years: Team
- 1997-2007: Cuba
Honours
Men's volleyball
Representing Cuba
America's Cup
Bronze medal – third place	2005 São Leopoldo
Pan American Games
Silver medal – second place	2003 San Domingo	Team

Tomás Aldazabal M. (born 30 May 1976, in Santa Fe) is a former volleyball player from Cuba who played as an outside hitter. He was a member of the Men's National Team that claimed the silver at the 2003 Pan American Games.

From 2009 to 2011, Aldazabal played for the Portuguese team Sporting Clube de Espinho.
