= Archipiélago de Sabana hutia =

Scientific classification
- Kingdom: Animalia
- Phylum: Chordata
- Class: Mammalia
- Infraclass: Placentalia
- Order: Rodentia
- Family: Echimyidae
- Genus: Capromys
- Species: C. pilorides
- Subspecies: C. p. gundlachianus

Trinomial name
- Capromys pilorides gundlachianus (Varona, 1983)

Synonyms
- Capromys gundlachianus

Subspecies of rodent

The Archipiélago de Sabana hutia (Capromys pilorides gundlachianus) is a subspecies of the Desmarest's hutia endemic to the Sabana-Camagüey Archipelago of Cuba.

== Taxonomy ==
It has traditionally been considered a subspecies of the Cuban hutia, but was tentatively elevated to species status by Verona in 1983 because of sequence divergence of a specimen from Cayo Ballenato del Medio. However, this locality is outside the published range of Capromys gundlachianus, so further studies are needed to confirm its taxonomic status. The IUCN does not recognize the Archipiélago de Sabana hutia as distinct from the Cuban hutia, and neither does the American Society of Mammalogists.
