= Ensenada de la Broa =

Bay in southern Cuba

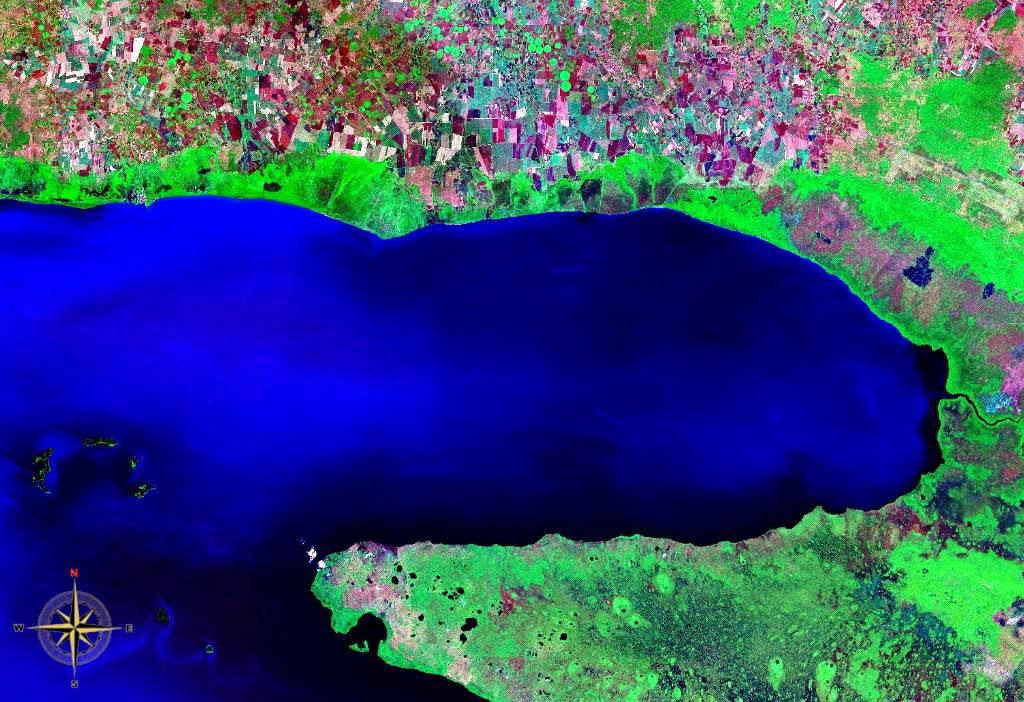
Ensenada de la Broa seen from space (false color)

Ensenada de la Broa is a bay in southern Cuba. It is located at 22.5833333°N 82°W, in the provinces of Matanzas and Mayabeque. The bay is a part of the Gulf of Batabano.
