= Rafael Cabrera Mustelier Airport =

Airport in Cuba

Rafael Cabrera Mustelier Airport Rafael Cabrera Airport Aeropuerto "Rafael Cabrera Mustelier"
- IATA: GER; ICAO: MUNG

Summary
- Airport type: Public
- Serves: Nueva Gerona, Cuba
- Elevation AMSL: 24 m (79 ft)
- Coordinates: 21°50′05″N 082°47′02″W

Map
- Location in Cuba

Runways
Direction	Length		Surface
Direction	m	ft	Surface
05/23	2,500	8,202	Asphalt
17/35	1,623	5,325	Asphalt
- Source: Aerodrome chart

Rafael Cabrera Mustelier Airport or Rafael Cabrera Airport (Spanish: Aeropuerto "Rafael Cabrera Mustelier") (IATA: GER, ICAO: MUNG) is an airport serving Nueva Gerona, the capital city of the Isla de la Juventud special municipality in Cuba.

== Facilities ==
The airport resides at an elevation of 24 m (79 ft) above mean sea level. It has two asphalt paved runways: 05/23 is 2,500 by 45 metres (8,202 ft × 148 ft) and 17/35 is 1,623 m × 30 m (5,325 ft × 98 ft).

== Airlines and destinations ==
Airlines	Destinations
Aerogaviota	Havana
Cubana de Aviación	Havana
