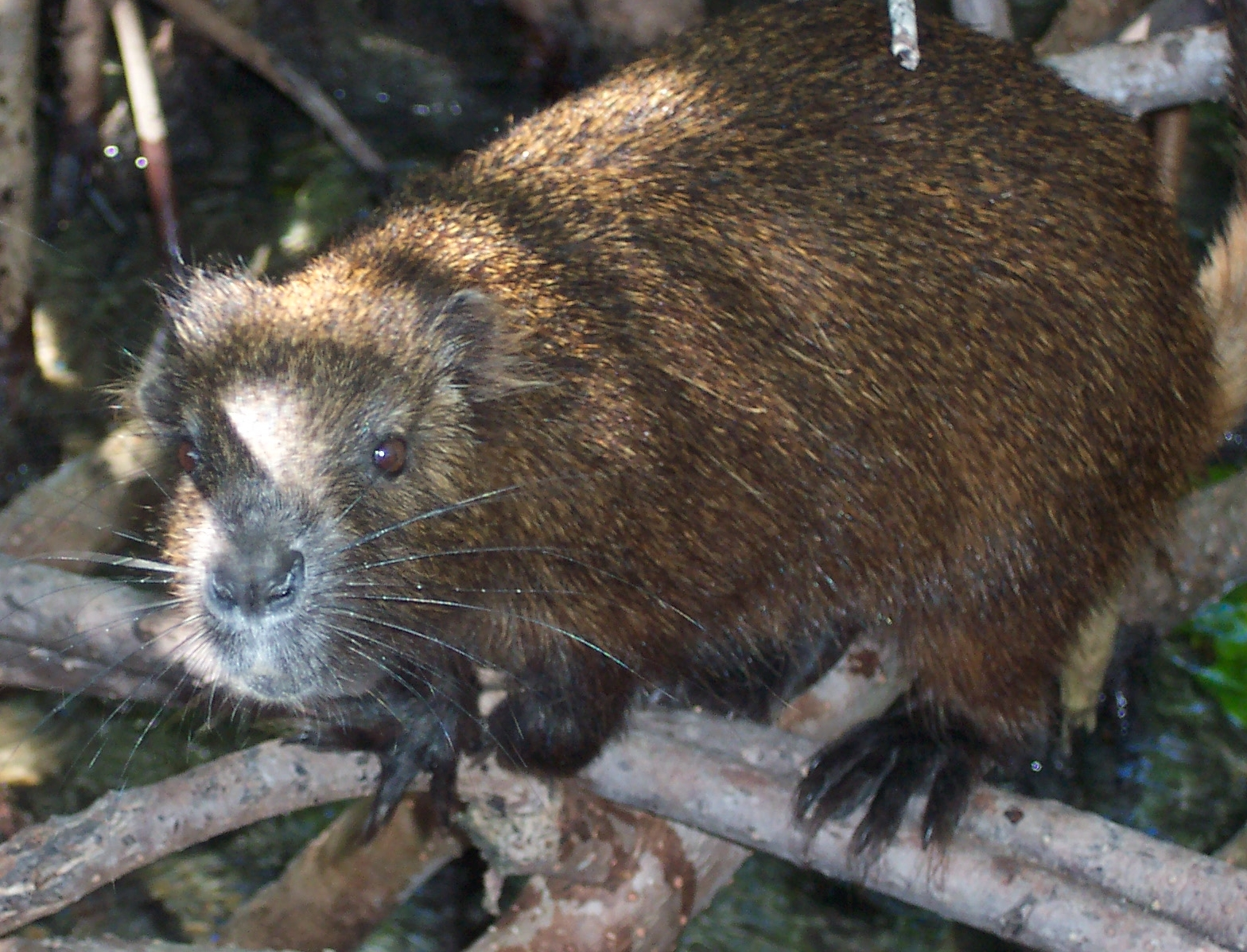

Conservation status
- Least Concern (IUCN 3.1)

Scientific classification
- Kingdom: Animalia
- Phylum: Chordata
- Class: Mammalia
- Order: Rodentia
- Family: Echimyidae
- Subfamily: Capromyinae
- Tribe: Capromyini
- Genus: Capromys
- Species: C. pilorides

Binomial name
- Capromys pilorides Say, 1822

Subspecies
- C. p. pilorides; C. p. ciprianoi; C. p. doceleguas; C. p. gundlachianus (Varona, 1983); C. p. relictus; †C. p. lewisi Morgan, MacPhee, R. Woods, & Turvey, 2019
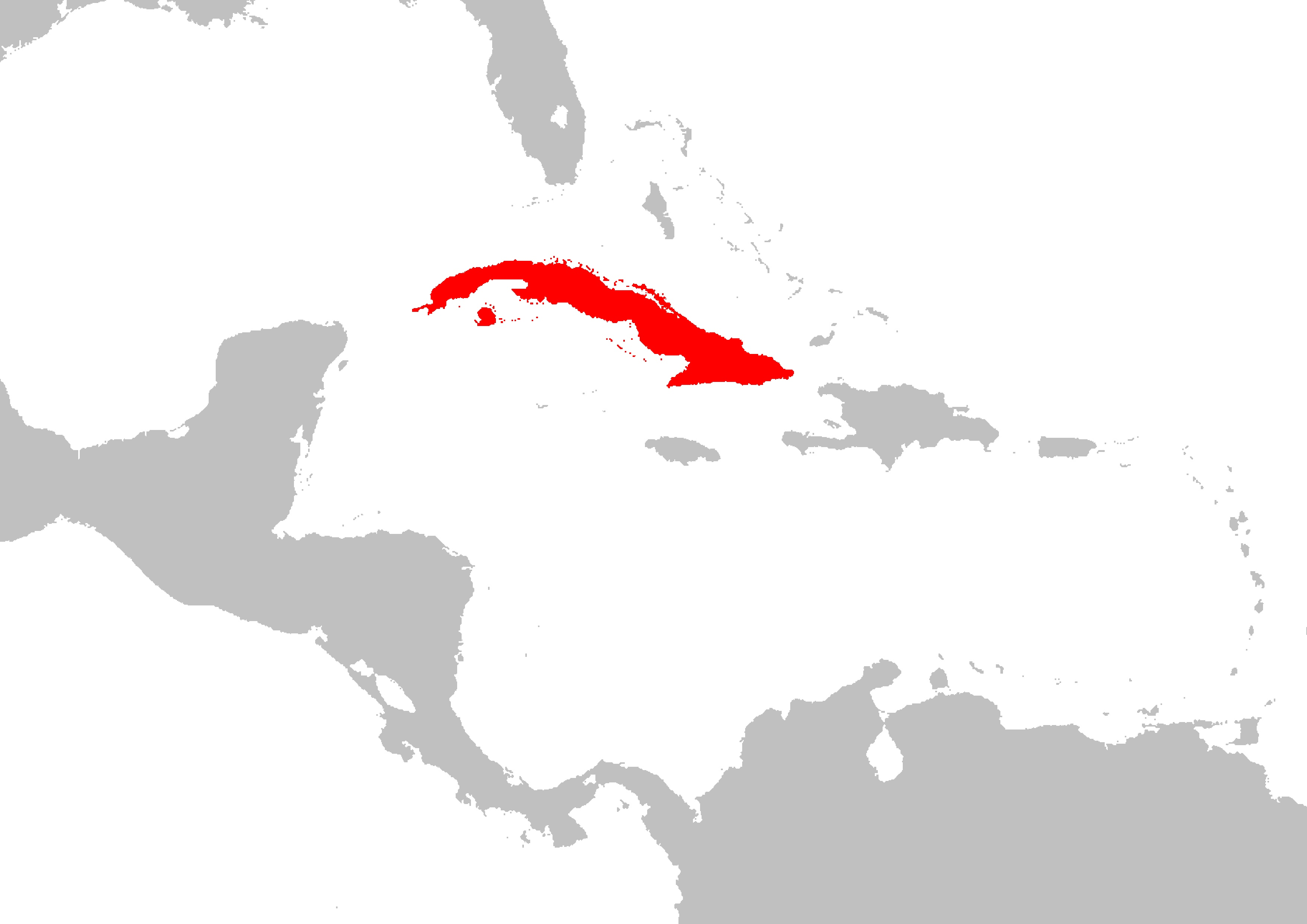

= Desmarest's hutia =

Species of mammal

Desmarest's hutia or the Cuban hutia (Capromys pilorides) is a stout, furry, rat-like mammal found only on Cuba and nearby islands. Growing to about 60 cm (2 ft), it normally lives in pairs and feeds on leaves, fruit, bark and sometimes small animals. It is the largest living hutia (subfamily Capromyinae), a group of rodents native to the Caribbean that are mostly endangered or extinct. Desmarest's hutia remains widespread throughout its range, though one subspecies (C. p. lewisi) native to the nearby Cayman Islands went extinct shortly after European colonization in the 1500s.

== Description ==
The Desmarest's hutia has a head-and-body length of 31–60 cm (12–24 in), a tail that is 14–29 cm (5.5–11.4 in) long, and weighs 2.8–8.5 kg (6.2–18.7 lb). It has thick, coarse fur which extends to the tip of the tail. The colour of the body fur varies from black to brown, with a light sand colour and red also seen. The body is stocky and the legs short. It moves with a slow, waddling gait, but can perform a quick hop when pursued. The feet have five toes with large claws which assist the animal in climbing. The stomach is divided into three compartments by constrictions in the gut and is among the most complex of any rodent.

Its karyotype has 2n = 40 and FN = 64.

== Habitat and distribution ==
The Desmarest's hutia is found in a wide range of habitats. In northern Cuba, populations tend to be centred on areas where there are abundant mangroves, while southern populations tend to favour a more terrestrial habitat. They are abundant in Guantánamo Province, particularly around the Guantanamo Bay Naval Base. In the mountainous areas of eastern Cuba, numbers of Desmarest's hutia are decreasing.

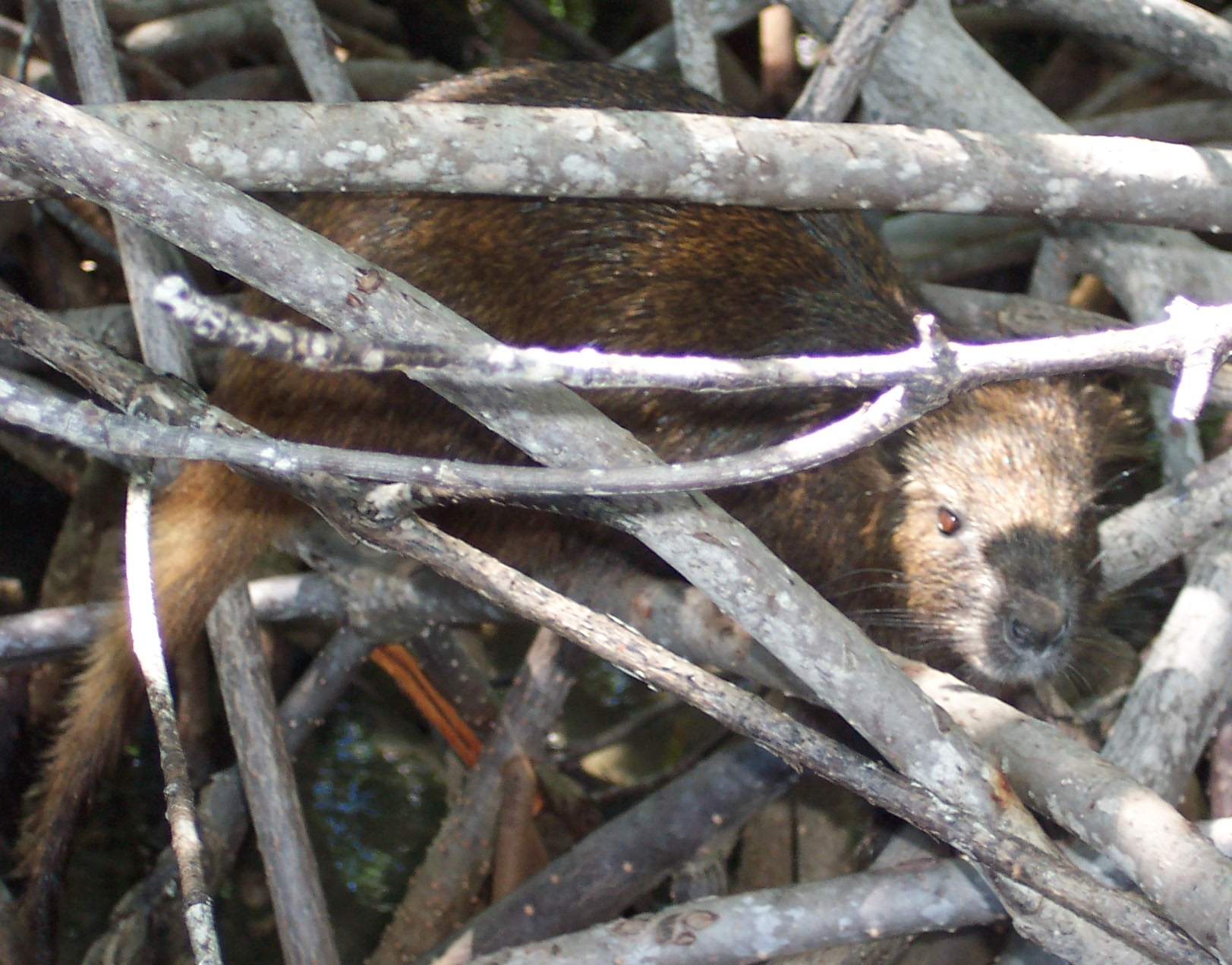
Desmarest's hutia shelters in thick mangroves

The Desmarest's hutia is found only in Cuba, but is widespread throughout its range. They are found on the main island, Isla de la Juventud, the Sabana archipelago, the Doce Lagunas archipelago and many of the other islands and cays of the Cuban archipelago. An extinct subspecies, C. p. lewisi, formerly lived in the Cayman Islands before it was wiped out shortly after European colonization. This subspecies may have been the subject of a report by Francis Drake when he visited the islands, in which he spoke of "little beast-like cats" and "coneys" throughout the area.

== Behaviour and reproduction ==
Desmarest's hutias normally live in pairs, but can be found individually or in small groups. They are diurnal and do not burrow, so during the night they rest in hollows in rocks or trees. They are omnivorous but eat mostly bark, leaves and fruit. Occasionally they will take small vertebrates such as lizards. Both males and females scent mark their territory with urine. They breed throughout the year with a gestation period of between 110 and 140 days (normally around 120 to 126 days), although peak breeding season is in June/July. They normally produce between one and three young, weighing an average of 230 g (8.1 oz). The young are precocial, with fur, fully open eyes and the ability to walk. They are weaned at around five months and reach sexual maturity at around ten months. In captivity they live for eight to eleven years.

== Interaction with humans ==
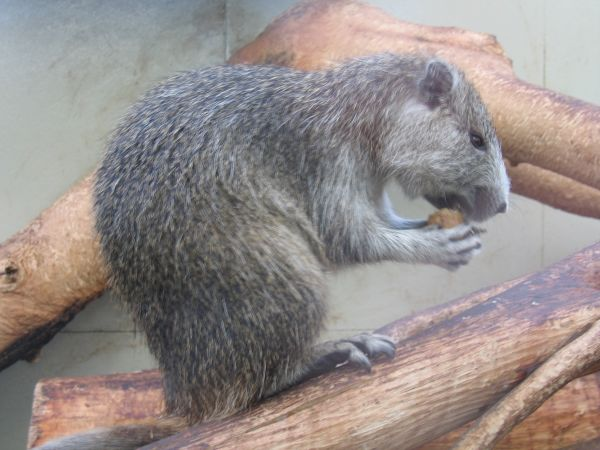
Desmarest's hutia in zoo

Hutias were traditionally hunted for food in Cuba as their flesh was agreeable and their size meant they provided a substantial meal. The Wild Animals Protection Act of 1968 made it illegal to hunt or kill hutias without a permit from the Ministry of Agriculture and Fisheries. In some areas they are so abundant that they cause damage to crops and are viewed as a pest.

== Taxonomy ==
The genus name Capromys derives from the two ancient greek words κάπρος (kápros), meaning "pig, boar", and μῦς (mûs), meaning "mouse, rat".

First described by Pallas in 1788 as Mys pilorides, it was later noted that Desmarest's hutia did not belong in that genus, and it was placed in the genus Capromys by Tate in 1935. Five extant subspecies are recorded: ciprianoi, doceleguas, gundlachianus, pilorides, and relictus. Studies have so far shown no genetic differences between the two subspecies ciprianoi and relictus found on Isla de la Juventud, but a 5% sequence deviation by gundlachianus found on Cayo Fragoso. The common name, Desmarest's hutia, is for Anselme Gaëtan Desmarest who described the species in 1822 with the synonym fourniere.

The extinct subspecies C. p. lewisi from the Cayman Islands is known from abundant subfossil material. It is close to the common Cuban Capromys pilorides, but smaller. The earliest radiocarbon records are latest Pleistocene and the latest are from around 1600 CE.

== Phylogeny ==
Within Capromyidae, the closest relatives of Capromys are the genera Mesocapromys and Mysateles. The three genera are the sister group to Geocapromys, and these four taxa belong to the tribe Capromyini. In turn, this clade is the sister group to Plagiodontia.

Genus-level cladogram of the Capromyidae
with their relationship to Carterodon and Euryzygomatomyinae.

- Octodontoidea
  - Euryzygomatomyinae
    - Trinomys (Atlantic spiny rats)
    - - Clyomys
      - Euryzygomatomys (guiaras)
  - - Carterodon (Owl's spiny rat)
    - Capromyidae
      - Plagiodontini
        Plagiodontia
      - Capromyini
        - Geocapromys
        - - Capromys (Desmarest's hutia)
          - - Mesocapromys
            - Mysateles

The cladogram has been reconstructed from mitochondrial and nuclear DNA characters.
