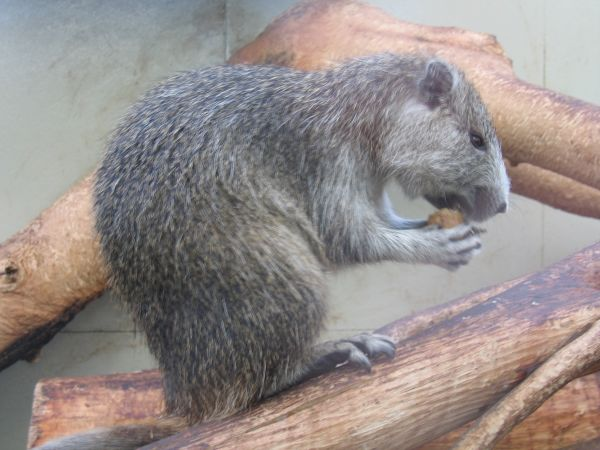
- Desmarest's hutia (Capromys desmaresti)

Scientific classification
- Kingdom: Animalia
- Phylum: Chordata
- Class: Mammalia
- Infraclass: Placentalia
- Order: Rodentia
- Family: Echimyidae
- Tribe: Capromyini
- Genus: Capromys; Desmarest, 1822

Type species
- Capromys pilorides Say, 1822

Species
- Capromys garridoi (possibly extinct); Capromys pilorides
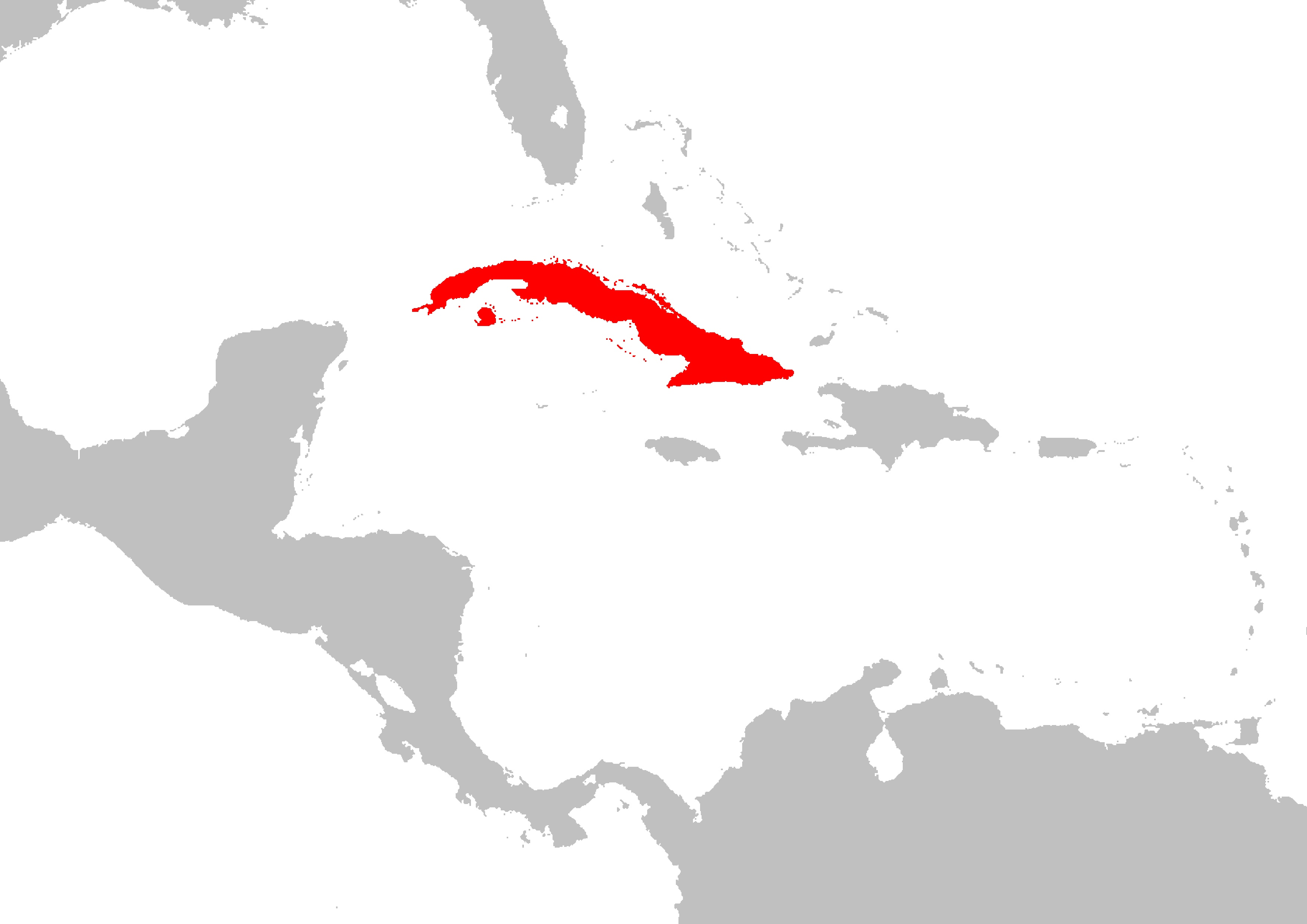

= Capromys =

Genus of mammal

Capromys is a genus of rodents that contains Desmarest's hutia, Garrido's hutia, and several recently extinct species, mainly from Cuba, although one extinct subspecies of Desmarest's hutia is known from Grand Cayman.

== Taxonomy ==
The genus name Capromys derives from Ancient Greek κάπρος (kápros), meaning "pig, boar", and μῦς (mûs), meaning "mouse, rat".

== Species ==
The following species are considered valid per Borroto-Páez (2012) and the American Society of Mammalogists:

- Capromys garridoi (Garrido's hutia, possibly extinct)
- Capromys pilorides (Desmarest's hutia or Cuban hutia)
  - C. p. ciprianoi
  - C. p. doceleguas
  - C. p. gundlachianus
  - †C. p. lewisi
  - C. p. pilorides
  - C. p. relictus
- †Capromys acevedo
- †Capromys latus

Capromys arredondoi and Capromys pappus are now synonymous with the Cuban hutia. Capromys antiquus is synonymous with C. acevedo. Capromys robustus is synonymous with C. latus.
