= Gulf of Batabanó =

Inlet or strait off southwestern Cuba in the Caribbean Sea

- Golfo de Batabanó (Spanish)
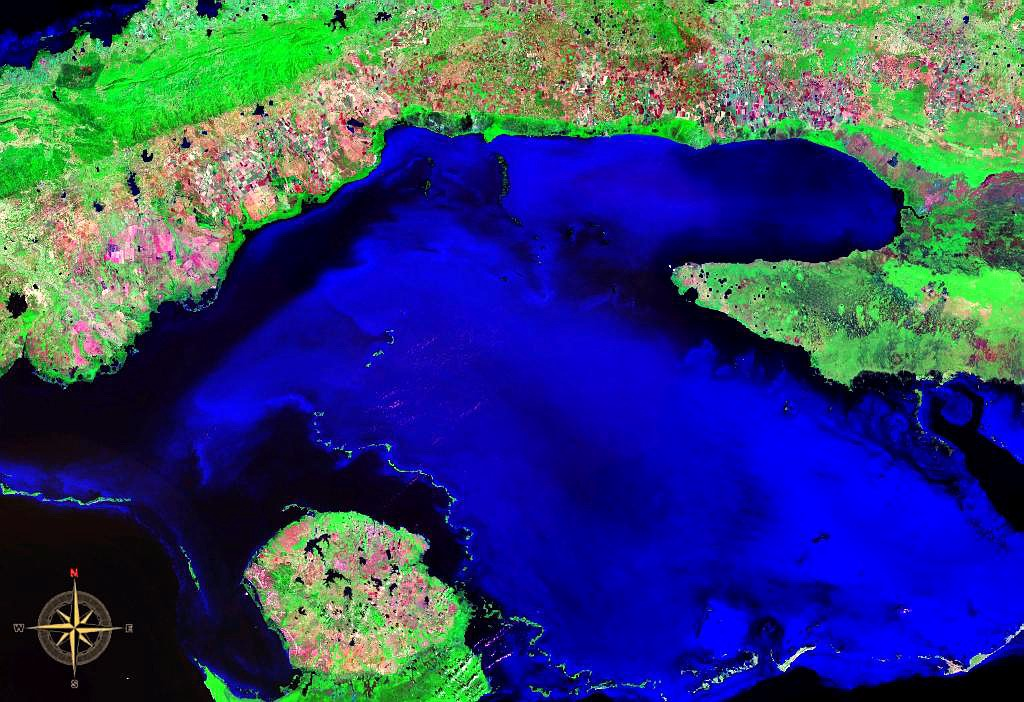
- Gulf of Batabanó seen from space (false colors).

- Location within Cuba Location within the Caribbean
- Coordinates: 22°15′N 82°30′W
- Basin countries: Cuba

The Gulf of Batabanó (Spanish: Golfo de Batabanó [ˈɡolfo ðe βataβaˈno]), also called the Batabanó Gulf, is an inlet or strait off southwestern Cuba in the Caribbean Sea, separating mainland Cuba from the Isle of Youth.

== Overview ==
The gulf's northern border begins at the southern coast of Cuba in Pinar del Río Province, Artemisa Province, Mayabeque Province and Matanzas Province, ending at the Zapata Peninsula (Península de Zapata), a length of about 80 miles (130 km). The northeastern section of the gulf is also called Ensenada de la Broa. The gulf stretches south about 50 miles (80 km) to the Isle of Youth. The gulf is shallow–less than 200 feet (61 m) deep–and contains about 350 smaller islands of the Canarreos Archipelago (los Archipiélago de los Canarreos) besides the Isle of Youth. The gulf is a center of sponge fishing.

== See also ==
- Batabanó
- Surgidero de Batabanó
