= Presidio Modelo =

Cuban museum and former jail

Coordinates: 21°52′40″N 82°45′59″W

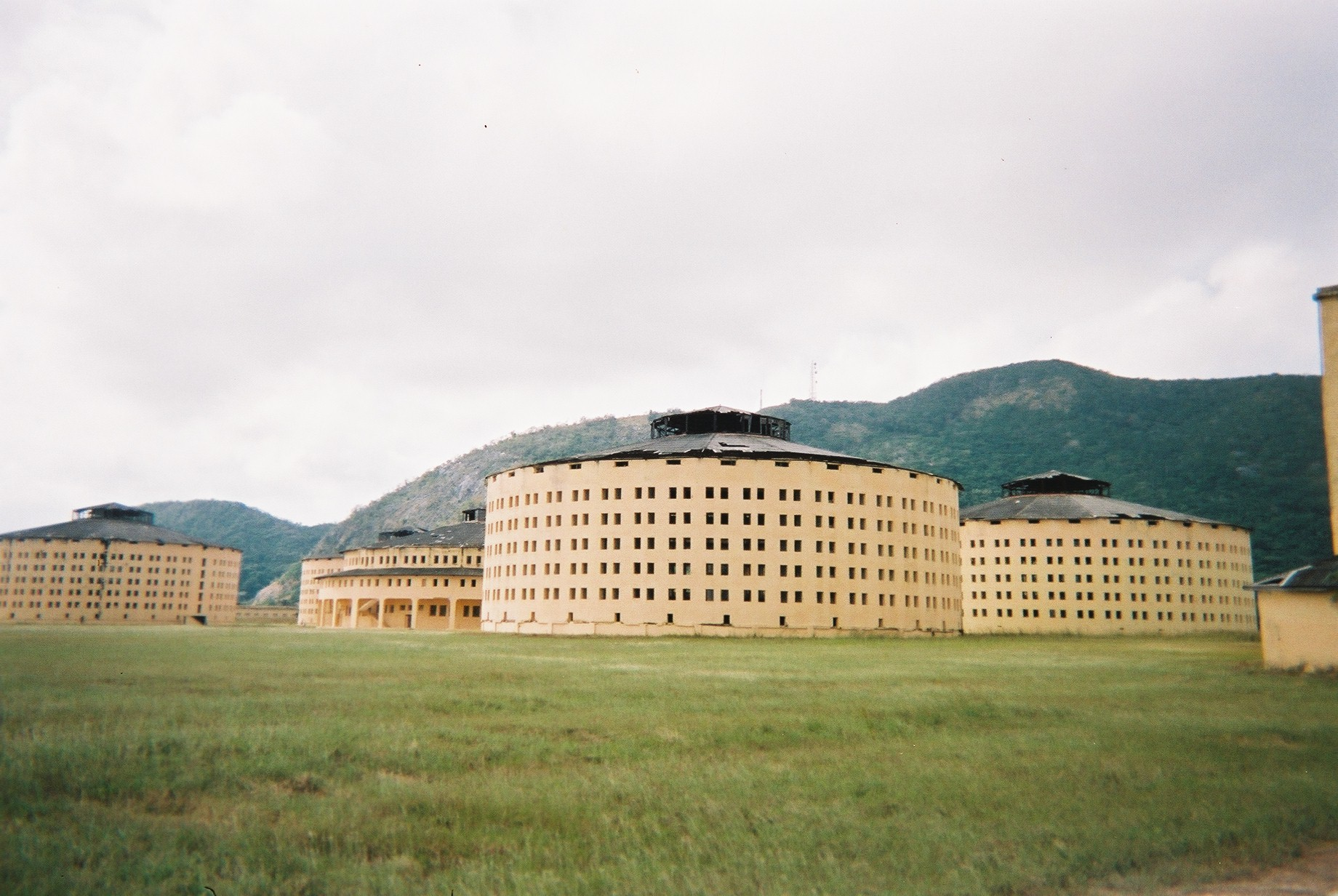
Presidio Modelo in 2005

The Presidio Modelo was a "model prison" with panopticon design, built on the Isla de Pinos ("Isle of Pines"), now the Isla de la Juventud ("Isle of Youth"), in Cuba. It is located in the suburban quarter of Chacón, Nueva Gerona.

== History ==
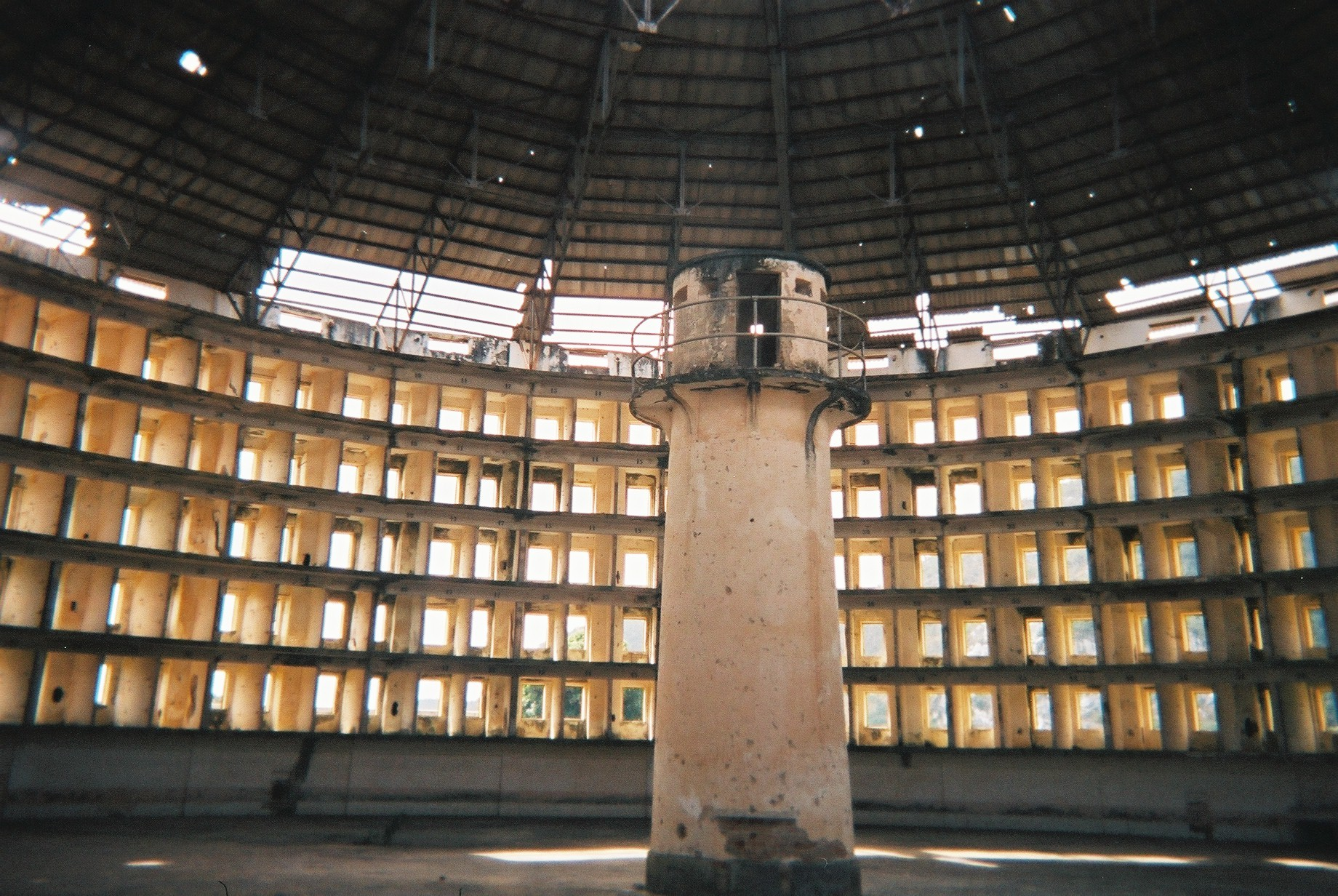
Inside one of the buildings

The prison was built under the President Gerardo Machado between 1926 and 1931. The five circular blocks, with cells constructed in tiers around central observation posts, were built with the capacity to house up to 5,000 prisoners. The panopticon design allowed the guards to watch the prisoners constantly.

Thirty of the survivors of the rebel attacks on Moncada Barracks in July 1953— including Fidel Castro and his brother, Raúl Castro— were imprisoned there until 1955. At that time, the four circular buildings were packed with 6,000 men, every floor was filled with trash, there was no running water, food rations were meager, and the government supplied only the bare necessities of life. However, Castro and the other rebels were not kept in the circular buildings with their small cells and harsh conditions, but were instead kept in the hospital wing, which had a larger living area with better beds and living conditions.

Dictator Fulgencio Batista had made the mistake of placing all the conspirators together in the hospital wing, and they proceeded to treat it as a revolutionary boot camp, congregating for daily lessons on politics and conducting secret communications with supporters around Cuba. "What a fantastic school this prison is!" Castro wrote in a letter. "From here I’m able to finish forging my vision of the world...".

After Castro's revolutionary triumph in 1959, Presidio Modelo remained in operation. By 1961, due to the overcrowded conditions (up to 4000 prisoners at one time), it was the site of various riots and hunger strikes, especially just before the Bay of Pigs Invasion, when orders were given to line the tunnels underneath the entire prison with several tons of TNT.

Prominent Cuban political prisoners such as Armando Valladares, Roberto Martín Pérez, and Pedro Luis Boitel were held there at one point or another during their respective incarcerations. It was permanently closed by the government in 1967.

The prison now serves as a museum and has been declared a national monument. The old administration building now serves as a school and research center.

== See also ==
- Human rights in Cuba
