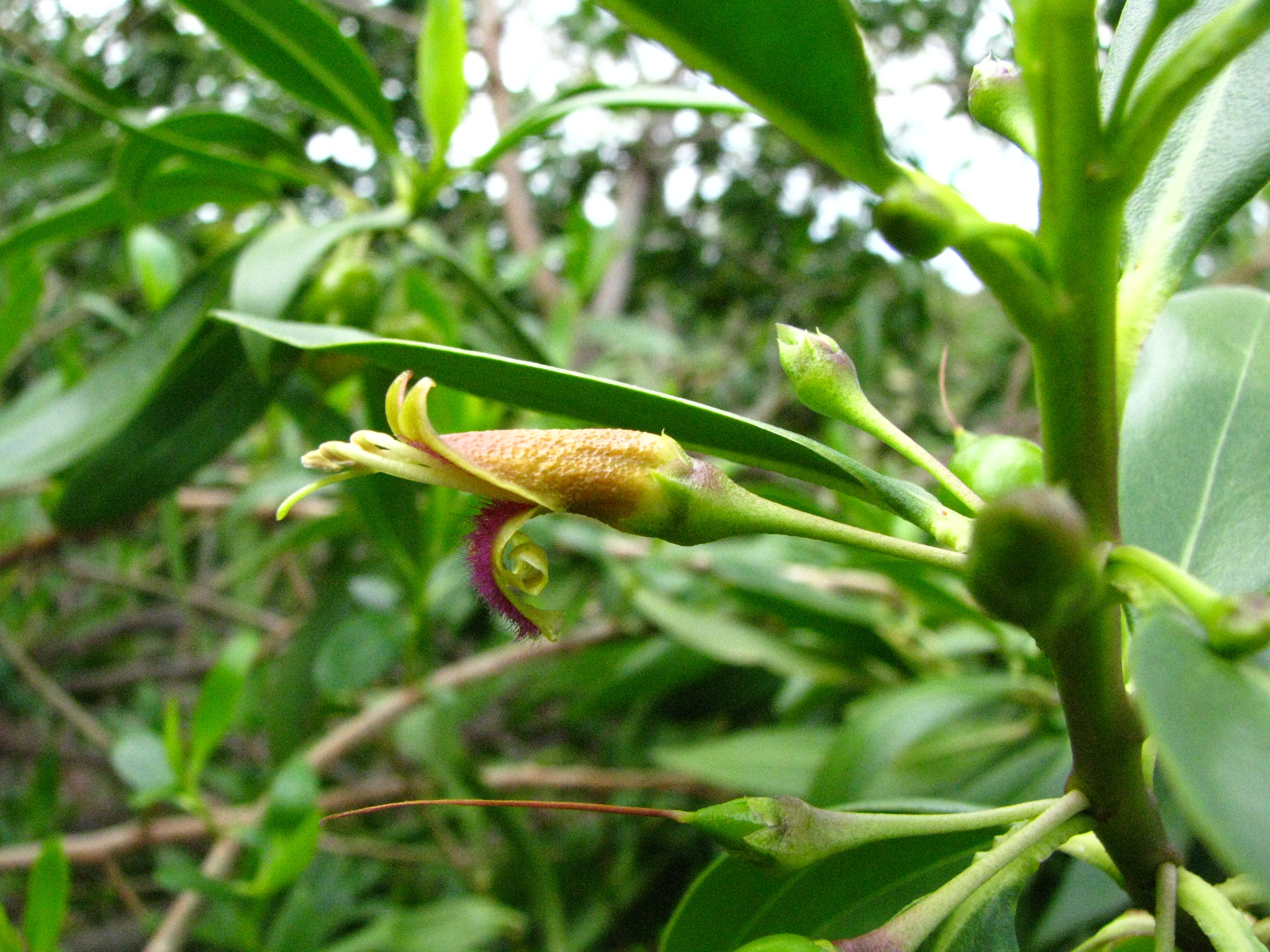
- Flower of cultivated specimen of Bontia daphnoides growing at Oʻahu

Scientific classification
- Kingdom: Plantae
- Clade: Tracheophytes
- Clade: Angiosperms
- Clade: Eudicots
- Clade: Asterids
- Order: Lamiales
- Family: Scrophulariaceae
- Tribe: Myoporeae
- Genus: Bontia; L.
- Species: B. daphnoides

Binomial name
- Bontia daphnoides L.

Synonyms
- Bontia daphnoides var. minor (C.F.Gaertn.) A.DC.; Bontia minor G.Gaertn.

= Bontia =

Genus of flowering plants

Bontia daphnoides, commonly known as wild olive or white alling, is the only species of the flowering plant genus Bontia in the family Scrophulariaceae. It is a shrub or small tree growing on many Caribbean islands both as a wild plant and cultivated in gardens.

== Description ==
Bontia daphnoides is a shrub or small tree sometimes growing to a height of 5 metres (20 ft) with a trunk up to 15 centimetres (6 in) in diameter. The bark is light brown, thick and grooved. Its leaves are arranged alternately, mostly 62–108 millimetres (2–4 in) long, 14–22 millimetres (0.6–0.9 in) wide, elliptic in shape with a mid-vein visible on the lower surface. They are crowded on the ends of the branches and have many small oil glands.

The flowers are arranged singly in the axils of leaves on a stalk 15–20 millimetres (0.6–0.8 in) long. There are 5 egg-shaped, green pointed sepals which have hairy edges and the petals are joined at their bases to form a tube 15–20 millimetres (0.6–0.8 in) long. The tube has two lobes of different sizes and the lower one is rolled back and covered on its upper surface with a dense layer of purple hairs. The tube is yellowish-brown and covered with many raised oil glands on the outside. Flowers are present for most of the year and are followed by fruits which are roughly spherical with a small beak, pale yellow at first but drying to brown.

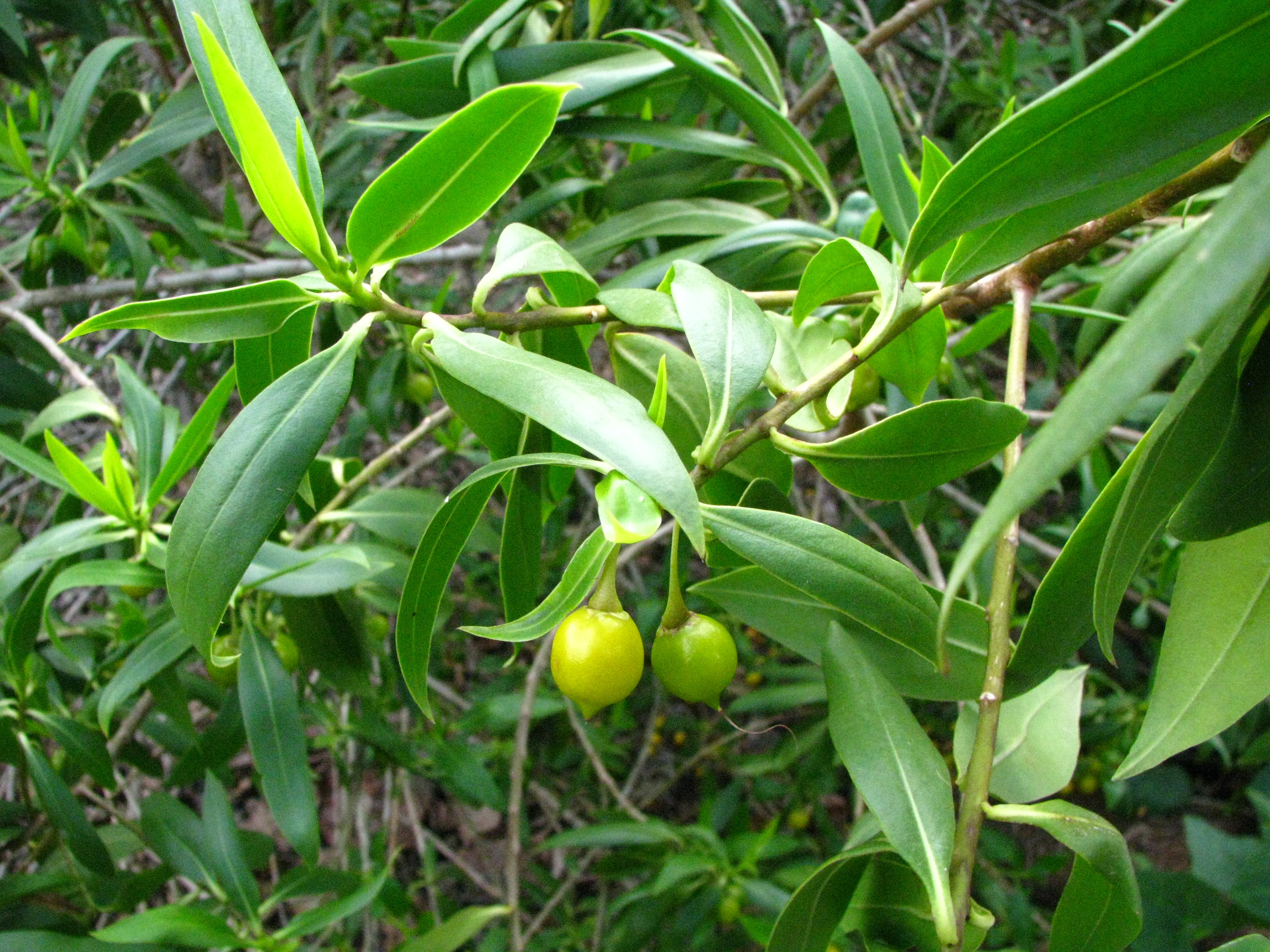
Bontia daphnoides leaves and fruits

== Taxonomy and naming ==
Bontia daphnoides was first formally described in 1753 by Carl Linnaeus and the description was published in Species Plantarum. The specific epithet (daphnoides) possibly refers to the similarity of this species to plants in the genus Daphne. The species has many common names depending on the language spoken on the island where it is found. The name white alling is used in the Virgin Islands and wild olive in Barbados. Other names include olivier bord de mer (Martinique), mang blanc (Haiti), mangle (Puerto Rico) and aceituna americana (Cuba).

Molecular phylogenetic work suggests that Bontia daphnoides is deeply nested within the genus Eremophila, a large genus of plants entirely native to mainland Australia, with the majority of species found in the arid zone.

== Distribution and habitat ==
Bontia daphnoides occurs on most of the islands in the Caribbean and on the coasts of Venezuela and Guyana. It is naturalised in Florida. It grows it coastal areas, often near mangroves where it is often the dominant plant.

== Use in horticulture ==
White alling is grown as a hedge or as a feature plant, especially in areas exposed to salt spray and are common in places like the coasts of Guyana. There are also grown in the high Andes of Venezuela and often occur as garden escapees.
