= Santa Fe, Isle of Youth =

Santa Fe La Fe
- Town
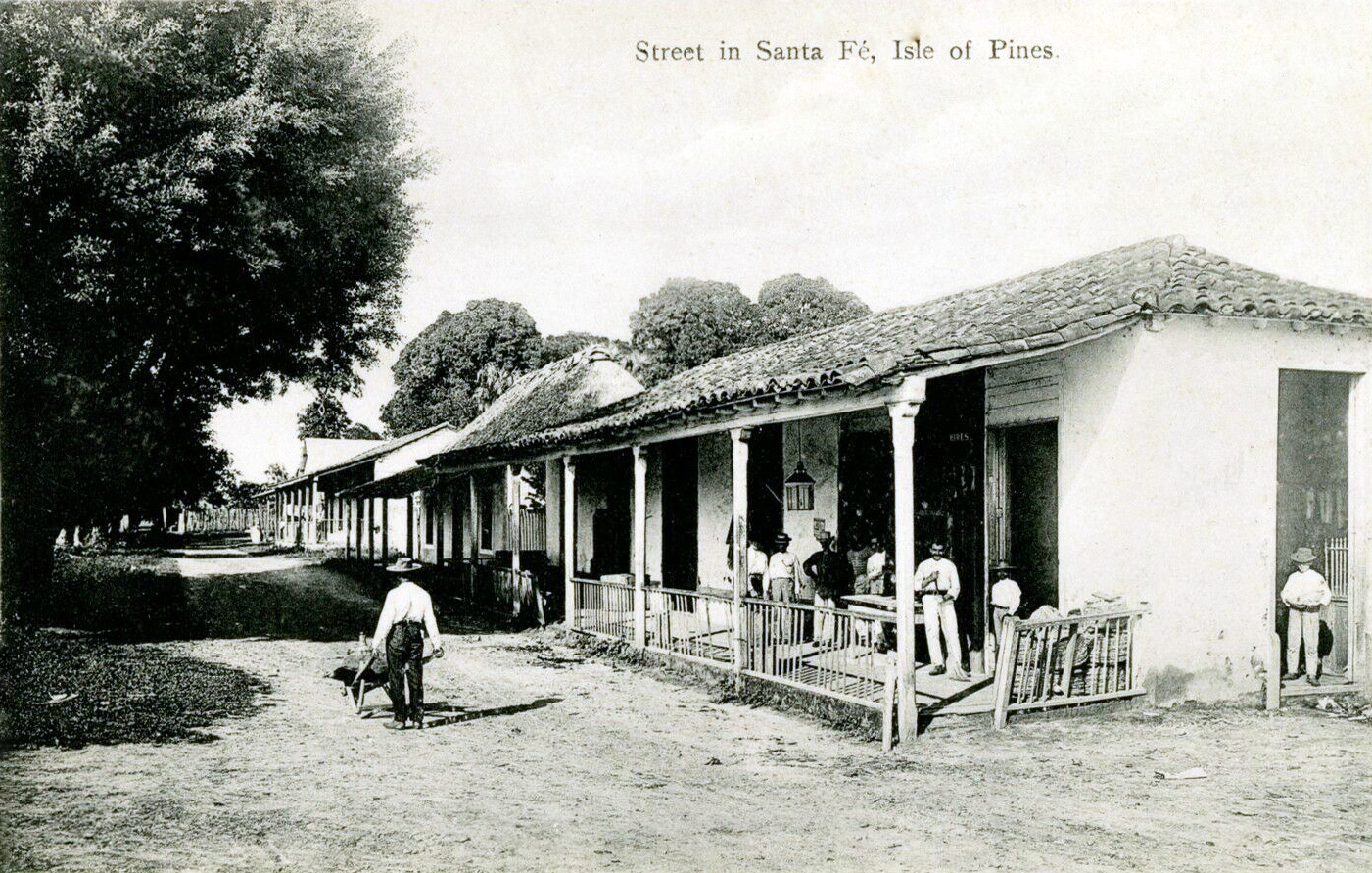
- A street in Santa Fe in 1910

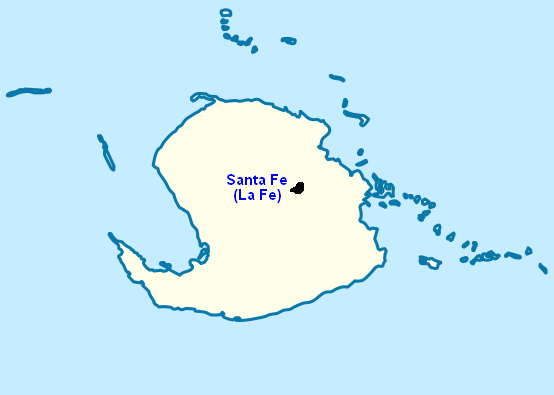
- Locator map of Santa Fe (in black) within Isla de la Juventud

- Location of Santa Fe in Cuba
- Coordinates: 21°44′40.9″N 82°45′26.1″W
- Country: Cuba
- Province: Isla de la Juventud
- Municipality: Isla de la Juventud
- Founded: 1809
- Elevation: 20 m (66 ft)
- Time zone: UTC-5 (EST)

Santa Fe, also named La Fe, is the second largest town on Isla de la Juventud of Cuba.

== Geography ==
The town is located 20 km south of Nueva Gerona, the island's seat and main town. It was the first settlement on the island, built around mineral springs. Santa Fe is linked with Nueva Gerona with a 15 km-long expressway.

== Personality ==
- Tomás Aldazabal (b. 1976), volleyball player

== See also ==
- List of cities in Cuba
- Municipalities of Cuba
- Autopista de la Isla de la Juventud
