= Nueva Gerona =

- Municipality
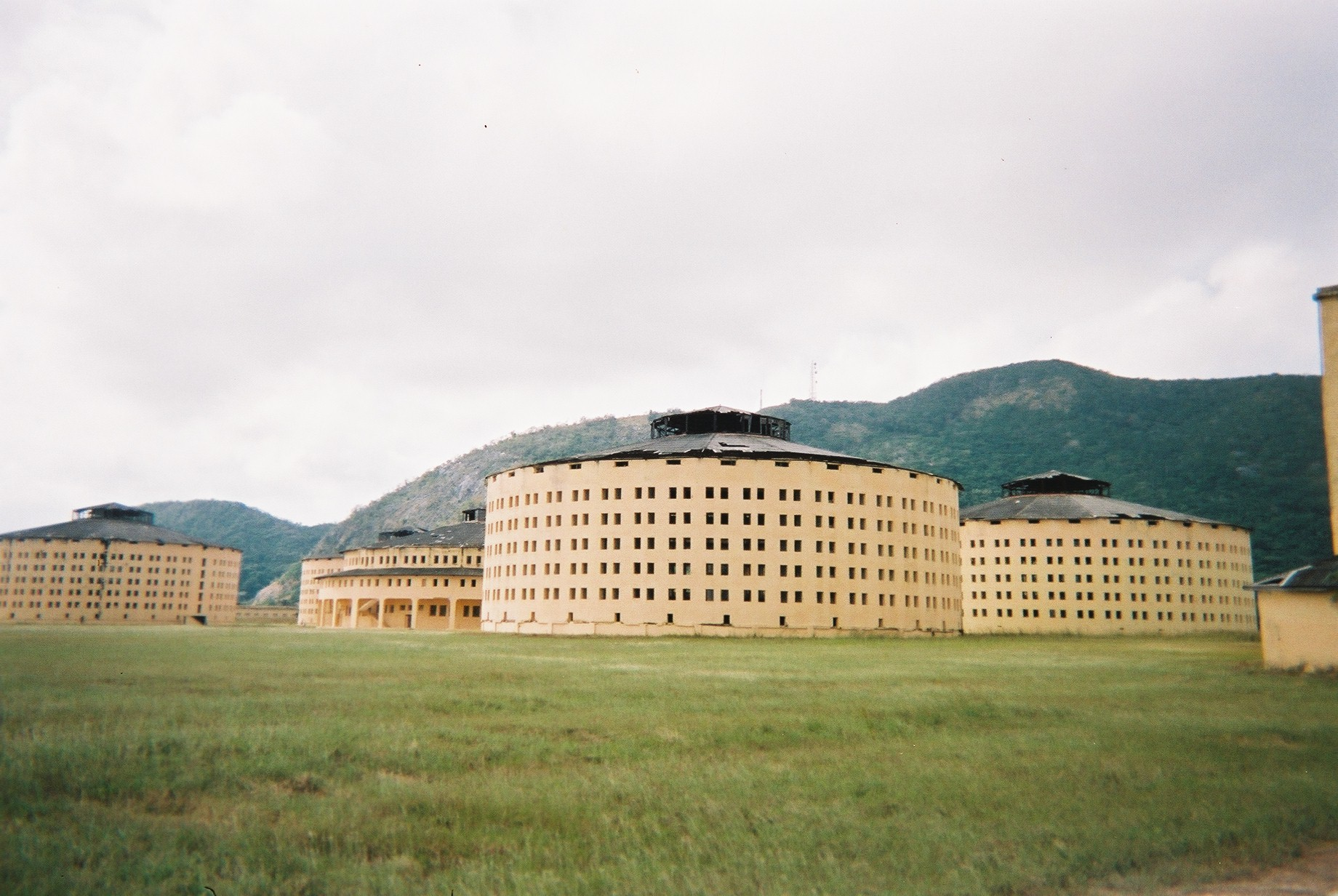
- The Presidio Modelo prison

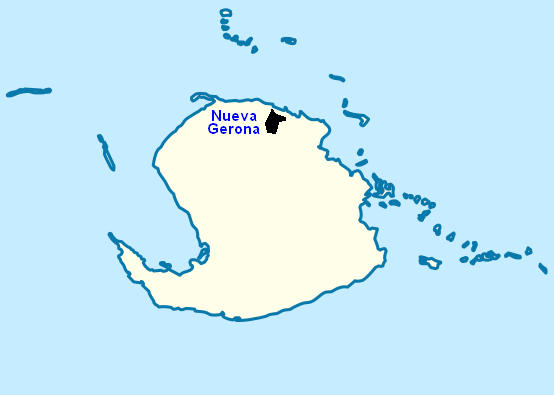
- Locator map of Nueva Gerona (in black) within Isla de la Juventud

- Location within Cuba
- Coordinates: 21°53′05″N 82°48′04″W
- Country: Cuba
- Province: Isla de la Juventud
- Founded: 1802
- Elevation: 17 m (56 ft)

Population (2012)
  - Total: 59,049
- Time zone: UTC-5 (EST)

Nueva Gerona (Spanish pronunciation: [nwe.β̞a.xe'ɾo.na]) is a Cuban city, capital of the Isla de la Juventud special municipality and province. As of 2012, its population was 59,049.

== History ==
The city was founded in 1830 by Francisco Dionisio Vives, who was the Spanish governor of Cuba at the time. There is an American graveyard in Nueva Gerona.

== Geography ==
Nueva Gerona is located by the coast, in the north-eastern area of the island, between the hills of Caballos and Casas. It is crossed by the river Río Las Casas, which provides a navigable waterway to the Caribbean Sea.

The city is divided into the repartos (quarters) of Centro, Abel Santamaría, Sierra Caballo, Nazareno, Saigón, Chacón and José Martí. The Presidio Modelo, a former prison currently used as a museum, is located in the suburban quarter of Chacón.

== Transport ==
Nueva Gerona is linked to La Fe (or Santa Fe), the 2nd most populated town of the island, with the 15 km-long expressway. The port of Surgidero de Batabanó, located in the harbor of the Río Las Casas estuary, provides transportation to the Cuban mainland. The Rafael Cabrera Mustelier Airport is located in the suburban quarter of José Martí.

== Sport ==
Professional baseball and football clubs representing Isla de la Juventud are based in Nueva Gerona. The city houses the Piratas de La Isla de La Juventud baseball club at the Estadio Cristóbal Labra. The club plays in the Cuban National Series, the country's primary domestic professional baseball competition. The city also houses FC Isla de La Juventud, which plays in the country's top football division, the Campeonato Nacional de Fútbol de Cuba.

== Twin Town ==
Nueva Gerona has the following sister city:

- Girona, Spain

== See also ==
- Cayo Largo
- List of cities in Cuba
- Municipalities of Cuba
- 1917 Nueva Gerona hurricane
