= Isla de la Juventud =

Island in the West Indies, belonging to Cuba

Coordinates: 21°45′N 82°51′W

- Special Municipality of Cuba
- Location of Isla de la Juventud

- Coat of arms

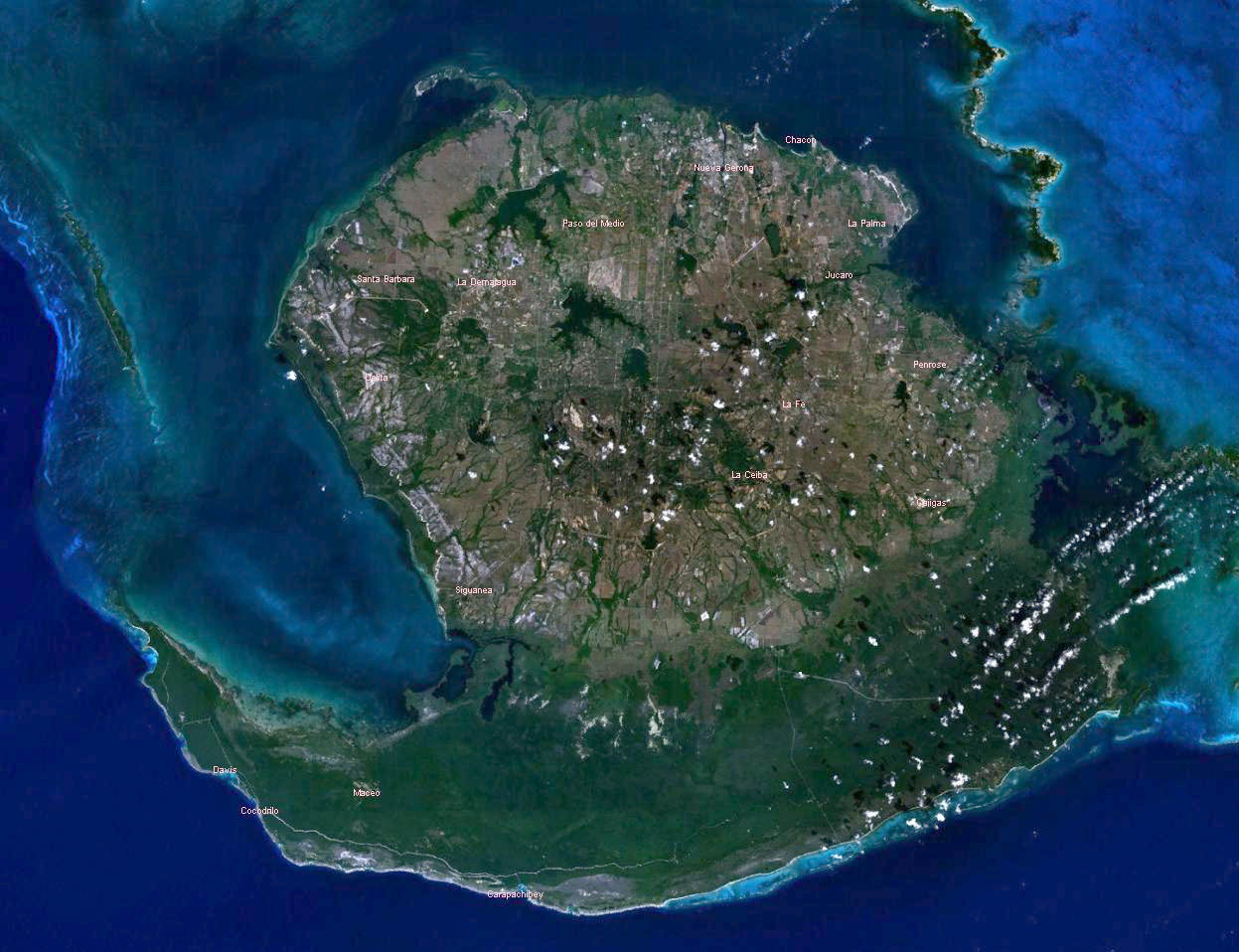
- Satellite view
- Country: Cuba
- Capital: Nueva Gerona

Area
  - Total: 2,419 km^{2} (934 sq mi)

Population (2024)
  - Total: 73,021
  - Density: 30.19/km^{2} (78.18/sq mi)
- Time zone: UTC-5 (EST)
- Area code: +53-46
- HDI (2019): 0.832 very high · 2nd of 16
- Website: www.redisla.gob.cu/es/

Isla de la Juventud (Spanish pronunciation: [ˈizla ðe la xuβenˈtuð]; lit. 'Isle of Youth') is the second-largest Cuban island (after Cuba's mainland) and the seventh-largest island in the West Indies (after mainland Cuba, Hispaniola, Jamaica, Puerto Rico, Trinidad, and Andros Island). The island was called the Isle of Pines (Spanish: Isla de Pinos) until 1978. It has an area 2,200 km^{2} (850 sq mi) and is 47.1 km (29 mi) south of the island of Cuba, across the Gulf of Batabanó. The island lies almost directly south of Havana and Pinar del Río and is a Special Municipality (2,419 km^{2} (934 sq mi)), not part of any province and is therefore administered directly by the central government of Cuba. The island has only one municipality, also named Isla de la Juventud.

The largest of the 350 islands in the Canarreos Archipelago (Archipiélago de los Canarreos), the island had an estimated population of 83,544 in 2019. The capital and largest city is Nueva Gerona in the north, and the second largest and oldest city is Santa Fe in the interior. Other communities include Columbia, La Demajagua (formerly Santa Bárbara), Mac Kinley, Cuchilla Alta, Punta del Este, Sierra de Caballos and Sierra de Casas.

== History ==
Little is known of the pre-Columbian history of the island, though a cave complex near the Punta del Este beach preserves 235 ancient drawings made by the native population, the Guanahatabey. The first written mention of these drawings comes from French traveller Charles Berchon while visiting the island in 1904. The caves were collectively designed as a National monument in 1979.

The island was first sighted by Europeans in 1494 during Christopher Columbus's second voyage to the New World. Columbus named the island La Evangelista, claiming it for Spain. The island was also known, at various points in its history, as Isla de Cotorras (Isle of Parrots) and Isla de Tesoros (Treasure Island).

Pirate activity in and around the area left its trace in English literature; notably, Treasure Island by Robert Louis Stevenson, and Peter Pan by J. M. Barrie, each drawing on accounts of the island and its native and pirate inhabitants, by reflecting the long dugout canoes that both pirates and the indigenous peoples used, and the American crocodile (Crocodylus acutus).

Following its defeat in the Spanish–American War and the Cuban War of Independence, Spain dropped all claims to Cuba under the terms of the 1898 Treaty of Paris. The Platt Amendment of 1901, which defined Cuba's boundaries for the purposes of U.S. authorities, left the U.S. position on sovereignty over the then Isla de Pinos undetermined.

This led to competing claims to the island by the United States and Cuba. In 1903, Cuba and the United States negotiated and signed the Hay-Quesada Treaty, which recognized Cuba's sovereignty over the island. In 1907, the U.S. Supreme Court decided, in Pearcy v. Stranahan, that control of the island was a political decision, not a judicial one. In 1916, a pamphlet titled Isle of Pines: American or What? called for the U.S. to annex or purchase the island to settle the issue. The U.S. Senate ratified the Hay-Quesada Treaty on March 13, 1925, over the objections of some four hundred United States citizens and companies, who owned or controlled about 95% of the island's land.

Prior to 1976, the island was part of La Habana Province. With the political and administrative reorganization of Cuban provinces in 1976, the island was given the status of "special municipality"; it is administratively equivalent to a province.

Fidel Castro presided at a ceremony changing the name of the island from Isla de Pinos to Isla de la Juventud on 3 August 1978. This was the realization of a promise that he had made in 1967, when he said "Let’s call it the Isle of Youth when the youth have done something grand with their work here, when they have revolutionized the natural environment, when they see the fruits of their labor and have revolutionized society here."

== Geography and economy ==
Much of the island is covered in pine forests, which is the source of the island's large wood industry (as well as its old name). The northern region of the island has low ridges from which marble is quarried, while the southern region is an elevated plain. Agriculture and fishing are the island's main industries, with citrus fruit and vegetables being grown. A black sand beach was formed by volcanic activity.

The island has a mild climate but is known for frequent hurricanes. It is a popular tourist destination, with many beaches and resorts, including Bibijagua Beach. Until the Cuban government expropriated all foreign-owned property in the early 1960s, much land was owned by Americans, and the island contained a branch of the Hilton Hotels chain.

== Demographics ==
In the 2012 official census, the Special Municipality of Isla de la Juventud had a population of 84,751. The racial makeup of the population was white 50,732 (59.9%), mestizo or mulatto 26,013 (30.7%) and black 8,006 (9.4%). With a total area of 2,419.27 km^{2} (934.09 sq mi), the Municipality had a population density of 35.8/km^{2} (93/sq mi).

"Caimaneros", the inhabitants of the south coast of the island, are descended from settlers from the Cayman Islands and Jamaica, and are English-speaking Cubans.

== Transportation ==
The main transportation to the island is by boat or aircraft. Hydrofoils (kometas) and motorized catamarans will make the journey from Batabanó to Nueva Gerona in between two and three hours. A much slower and larger cargo ferry takes around six hours to make the crossing.

== Presidio Modelo ==
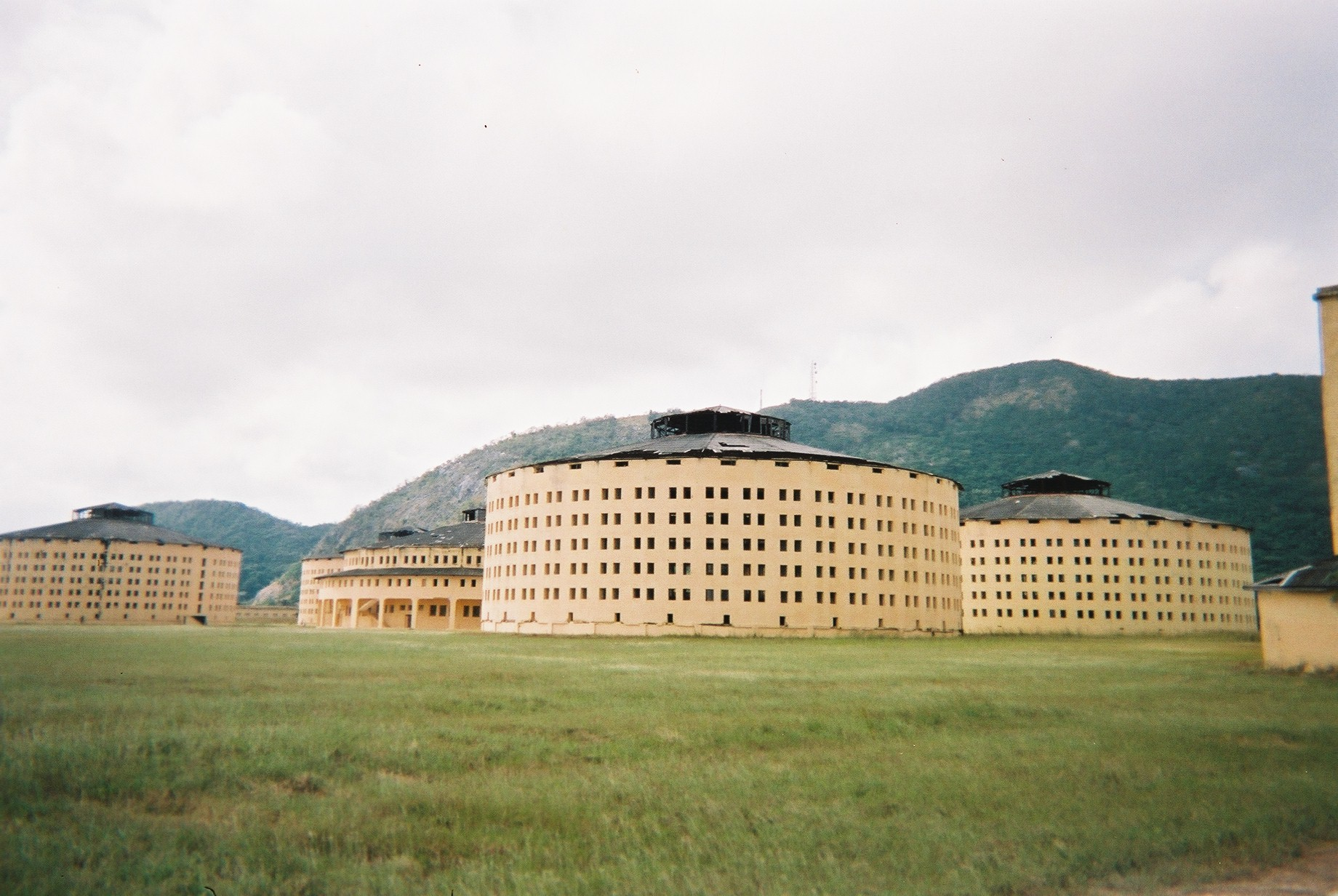
Presidio Modelo in 2005

The Presidio Modelo was erected between 1926 and 1931. The model panopticon penitentiary is on the outskirts of Nueva Gerona. It was the place where, after leading a failed attack on the Moncada Barracks in July 1953, Fidel Castro, along with his brother Raúl Castro, was imprisoned by the regime of Fulgencio Batista from 1953 to 1955.

Following the Cuban Revolution, the same facility was used to imprison the new regime's enemies and political dissidents. They included Huber Matos, an officer in the revolutionary army who attempted to resign and who said he was tortured there. Armando Valladares wrote a memoir describing the prison's harsh conditions and cruel treatment of political prisoners. Presidio Modelo ceased functioning as a prison in 1967. It has been declared a national monument and its hospital rooms converted into a museum.
