= List of mammals of Cuba =

This is a list of the mammal species recorded in Cuba. Of the mammal species in Cuba, twelve of the species listed are considered to be extinct.

The following tags are used to highlight each species' conservation status as assessed by the International Union for Conservation of Nature:

EX	Extinct	No reasonable doubt that the last individual has died.
EW	Extinct in the wild	Known only to survive in captivity or as a naturalized populations well outside its previous range.
CR	Critically endangered	The species is in imminent risk of extinction in the wild.
EN	Endangered	The species is facing an extremely high risk of extinction in the wild.
VU	Vulnerable	The species is facing a high risk of extinction in the wild.
NT	Near threatened	The species does not meet any of the criteria that would categorise it as risking extinction but it is likely to do so in the future.
LC	Least concern	There are no current identifiable risks to the species.
DD	Data deficient	There is inadequate information to make an assessment of the risks to this species.

== Order: Sirenia (manatees and dugongs) ==
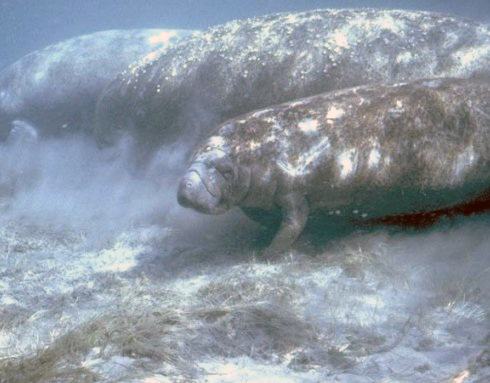
West Indian manatees

Sirenia is an order of fully aquatic, herbivorous mammals that inhabit rivers, estuaries, coastal marine waters, swamps, and marine wetlands. All four species are endangered.

- Family: Trichechidae
  - Genus: Trichechus
    - West Indian manatee, T. manatus VU

== Order: Rodentia (rodents) ==
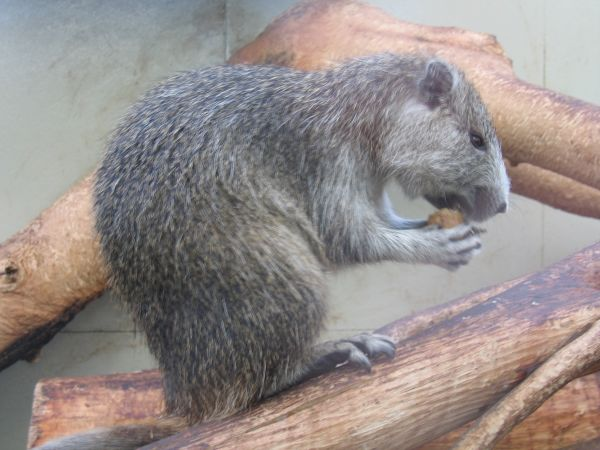
Desmarest's hutia

Rodents make up the largest order of mammals, with over 40% of mammalian species. They have two incisors in the upper and lower jaw which grow continually and must be kept short by gnawing. Most rodents are small though the capybara can weigh up to 45 kg (99 lb).

- Suborder: Hystricomorpha
  - Family: Dasyproctidae
    - Genus: Dasyprocta
      - Mexican agouti, D. mexicana VU introduced
      - Central American agouti, D. punctata LC introduced
  - Family: Cuniculidae
    - Genus: Cuniculus
      - Lowland paca, C. paca LC introduced
  - Family: Capromyidae
    - Subfamily: Capromyinae
      - Genus: Capromys
        - Desmarest's hutia, C. pilorides LC
      - Genus: Mesocapromys
        - Cabrera's hutia, M. angelcabrerai CR
        - Eared hutia, M. auritus EN
        - Dwarf hutia, M. nanus CR, possibly EX
        - San Felipe hutia, M. sanfelipensis CR, possibly EX
      - Genus: Mysateles
        - Garrido's hutia, M. garridoi CR, possibly EX
        - Gundlach's hutia, M. gundlachi VU
        - Black-tailed hutia, M. melanurus VU
        - Southern hutia, M. meridionalis CR
        - Prehensile-tailed hutia, M. prehensilis NT
- Suborder: Muridae
  - Family: Muridae
    - Genus: Mus
      - House mouse, M. musculus LC introduced
    - Genus: Rattus
      - Brown rat, R. norvegicus LC introduced
      - Black rat, R. rattus LC introduced

== Order: Primates (Monkeys, apes and lemurs) ==
There are 190 – 448 species of living primates, depending on which classification is used. They have an opposable thumb for grasping objects.

- Family: Cercopithecidae
  - Genus: Macaca
    - Long tailed macaque, M.fascicularis EN introduced
  - Genus: Chlorocebus
    - Green monkey, C. sabaeus LC introduced

== Order: Lagomorpha (rabbits, hares and pikas) ==
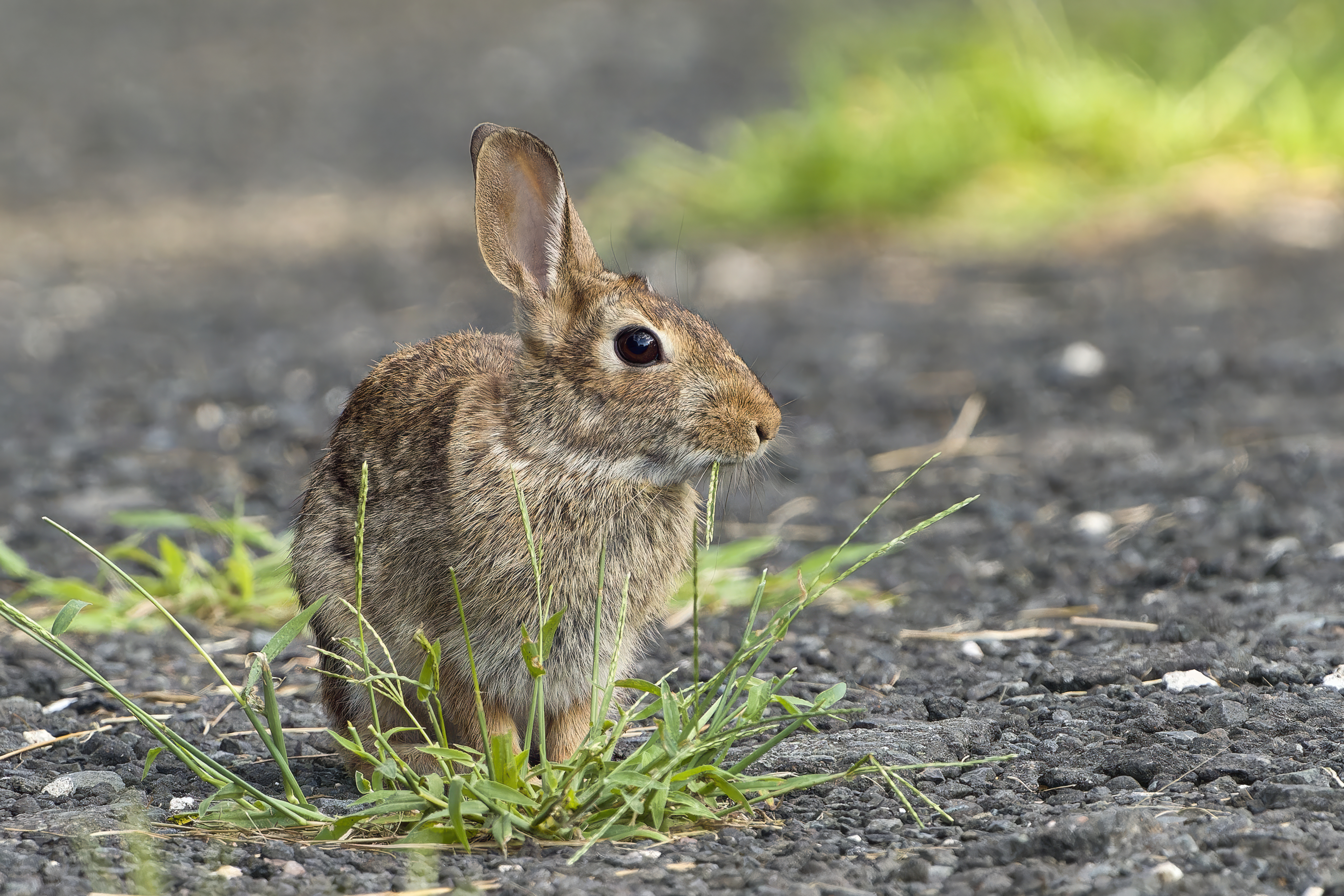
Eastern cottontail

They differ from rodents in a number of physical characteristics, such as having four incisors in the upper jaw rather than two.

- Family: Leporidae
  - Genus: Sylvilagus
    - Eastern cottontail, S. floridanus LC introduced

== Order: Eulipotyphla (shrews, hedgehogs, moles, and solenodons) ==
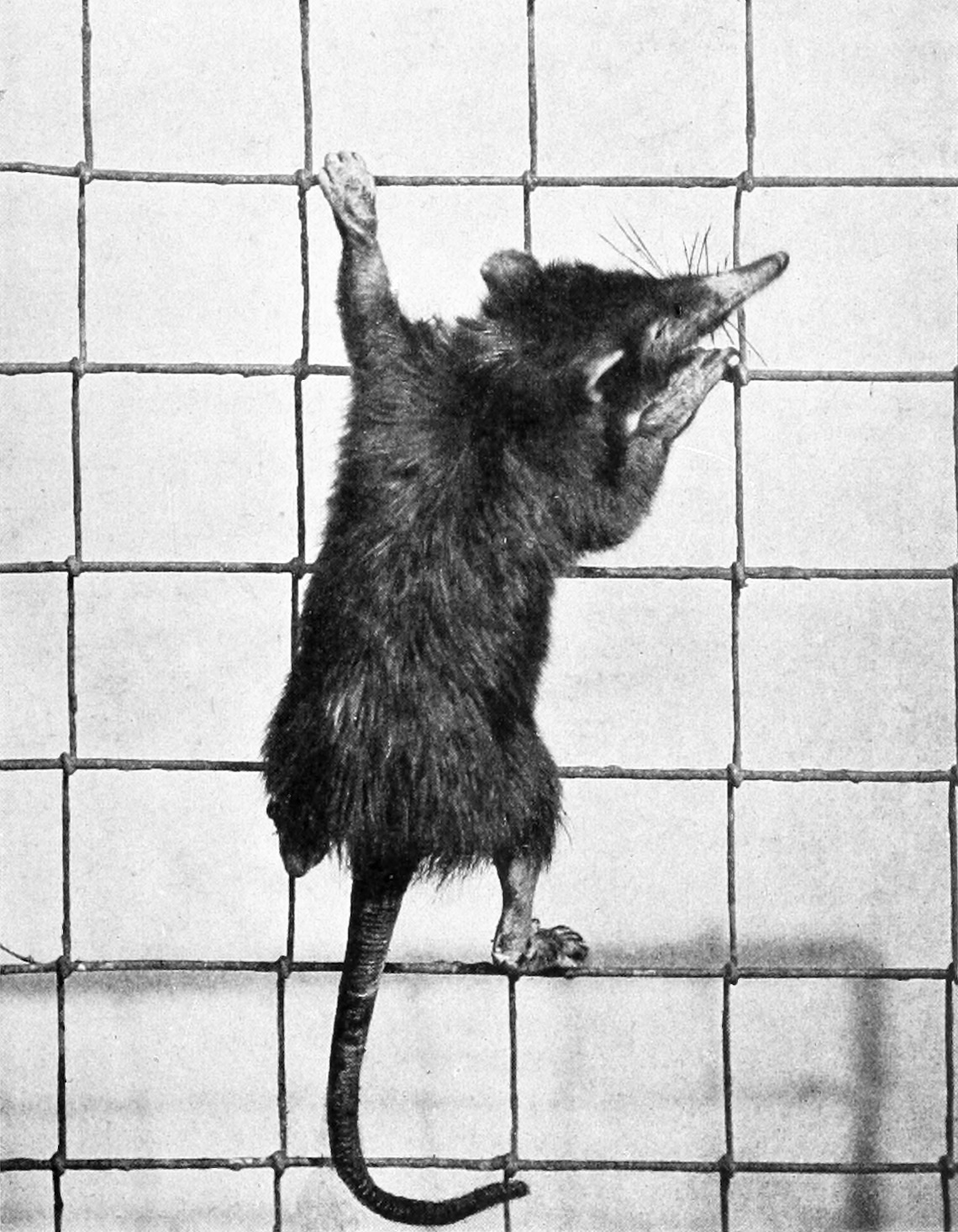
Cuban solenodon

Eulipotyphlans are insectivorous mammals. Shrews and solenodons closely resemble mice, hedgehogs carry spines, while moles are stout-bodied burrowers.

- Family: Solenodontidae
  - Genus: Atopogale
    - Cuban solenodon, A. cubana EN

== Order: Chiroptera (bats) ==
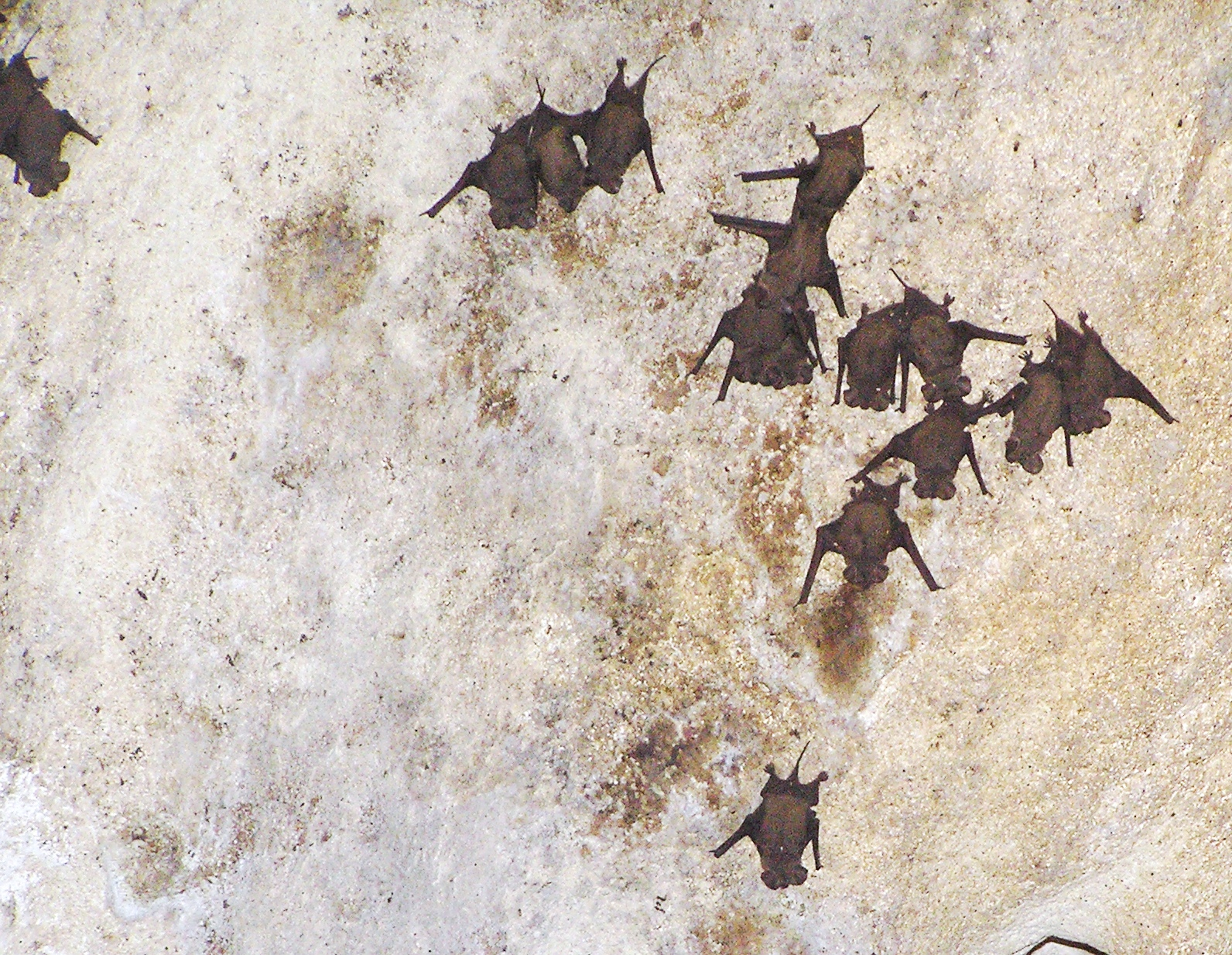
Mexican free-tailed bats

The bats' most distinguishing feature is that their forelimbs are developed as wings, making them the only mammals capable of flight. Bat species account for about 20% of all mammals.

- Family: Noctilionidae
  - Genus: Noctilio
    - Greater bulldog bat, N. leporinus LC
- Family: Vespertilionidae
  - Subfamily: Vespertilioninae
    - Genus: Antrozous
      - Pallid bat, A. pallidus LC
    - Genus: Eptesicus
      - Big brown bat, E. fuscus LC
    - Genus: Lasiurus
      - Eastern red bat, L. borealis LC
- Family: Molossidae
  - Genus: Eumops
    - Wagner's bonneted bat, E. glaucinus LC
  - Genus: Mormopterus
    - Little goblin bat, M. minutus VU
  - Genus: Nyctinomops
    - Broad-eared bat, N. laticaudatus LC
    - Big free-tailed bat, N. macrotis LC
  - Genus: Tadarida
    - Mexican free-tailed bat, T. brasiliensis LC
- Family: Mormoopidae
  - Genus: Mormoops
    - Antillean ghost-faced bat, M. blainvillii LC
    - Ghost-faced bat, M. megalophylla LC extirpated
  - Genus: Pteronotus
    - Macleay's mustached bat, P. macleayii LC
    - Parnell's mustached bat, P. parnellii LC
    - Sooty mustached bat, P. quadridens LC
- Family: Phyllostomidae
  - Subfamily: Phyllostominae
    - Genus: Macrotus
      - Waterhouse's leaf-nosed bat, M. waterhousii LC
  - Subfamily: Brachyphyllinae
    - Genus: Brachyphylla
      - Cuban fruit-eating bat, B. nana LC
  - Subfamily: Phyllonycterinae
    - Genus: Erophylla
      - Buffy flower bat, E. sezekorni LC
    - Genus: Phyllonycteris
      - Cuban flower bat, P. poeyi LC
  - Subfamily: Glossophaginae
    - Genus: Monophyllus
      - Leach's single leaf bat, M. redmani LC
  - Subfamily: Stenodermatinae
    - Genus: Artibeus
      - Jamaican fruit bat, A. jamaicensis LC
    - Genus: Phyllops
      - Cuban fig-eating bat, P. falcatus LC
  - Subfamily: Desmodontinae
    - Genus: Desmodus
      - Common vampire bat, D. rotundus LC extirpated
- Family: Natalidae
  - Genus: Chilonatalus
    - Cuban funnel-eared bat, C. micropus VU
  - Genus: Nyctiellus
    - Gervais's funnel-eared bat, N. lepidus LC

== Order: Cetacea (whales) ==
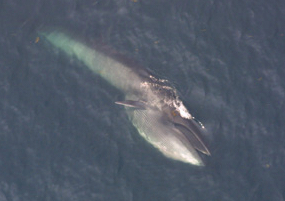
Sei whale

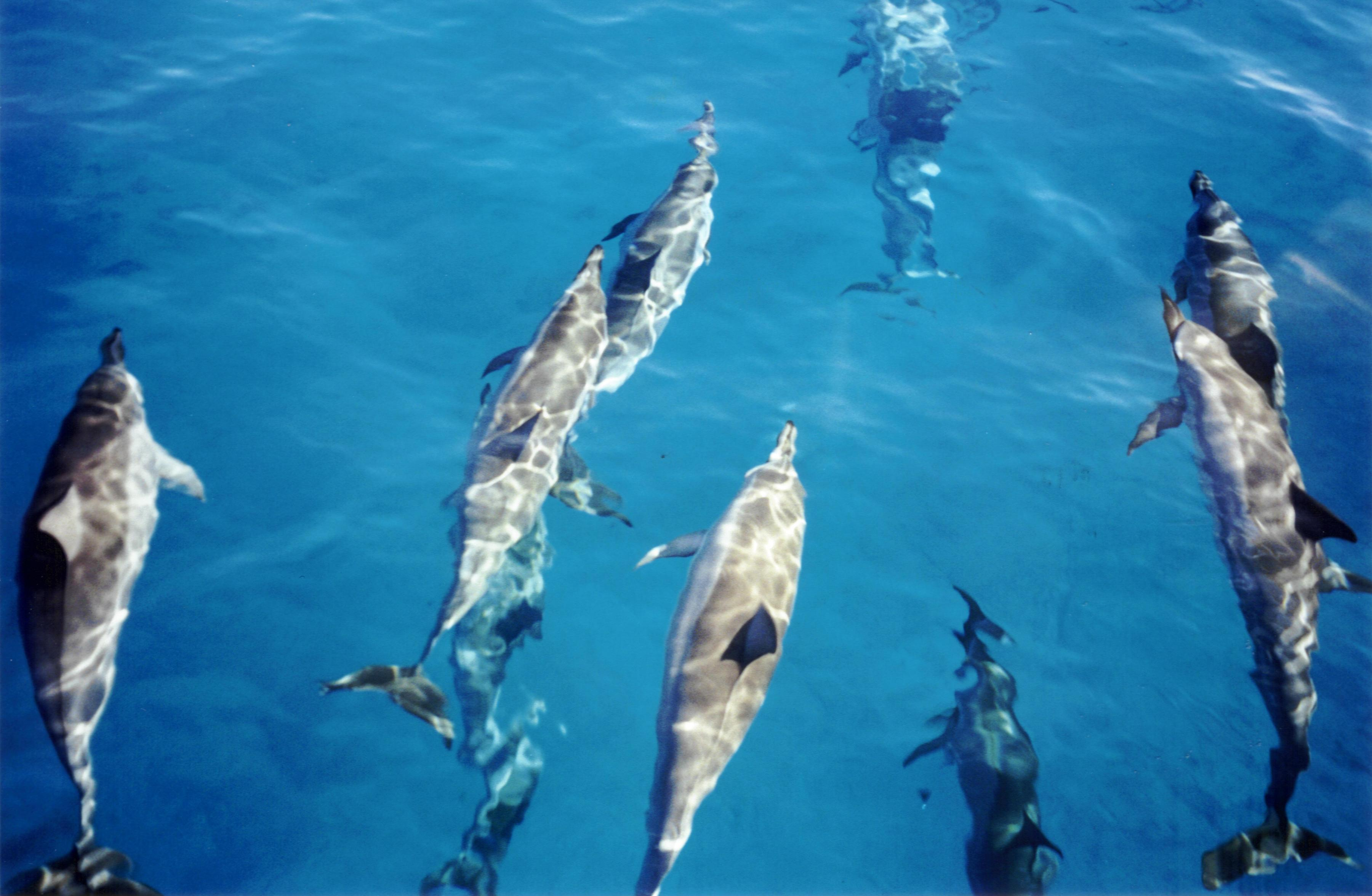
Spinner dolphins

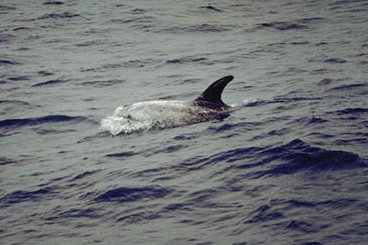
Risso's dolphin

The order Cetacea includes whales, dolphins and porpoises. They are the mammals most fully adapted to aquatic life with a spindle-shaped nearly hairless body, protected by a thick layer of blubber, and forelimbs and tail modified to provide propulsion underwater.

- Suborder: Mysticeti
  - Family: Balaenopteridae (baleen whales)
  - Family: Balaenidae
    - Genus: Eubalaena
      - North Atlantic right whale, Eubalaena glacialis EN
    - Genus: Balaenoptera
      - Common minke whale, B. acutorostrata LC
      - Sei whale, B. borealis EN
      - Bryde's whale, B. brydei DD
      - Blue whale, B. musculus EN
    - Genus: Megaptera
      - Humpback whale, M. novaeangliae LC
- Suborder: Odontoceti
  - Superfamily: Platanistoidea
    - Family: Delphinidae (marine dolphins)
      - Genus: Delphinus
        - Short-beaked common dolphin, D. delphis LC
      - Genus: Feresa
        - Pygmy killer whale, F. attenuata LC
      - Genus: Globicephala
        - Short-finned pilot whale, G. macrorhyncus LC
      - Genus: Lagenodelphis
        - Fraser's dolphin, L. hosei LC
      - Genus: Grampus
        - Risso's dolphin, G. griseus LC
      - Genus: Orcinus
        - Killer whale, O. orca DD
      - Genus: Peponocephala
        - Melon-headed whale, P. electra LC
      - Genus: Pseudorca
        - False killer whale, P. crassidens NT
      - Genus: Stenella
        - Pantropical spotted dolphin, Stenella attenuata LC
        - Clymene dolphin, S. clymene LC
        - Striped dolphin, S. coeruleoalba LC
        - Atlantic spotted dolphin, S. frontalis LC
        - Spinner dolphin, S. longirostris LC
      - Genus: Steno
        - Rough-toothed dolphin, S. bredanensis LC
      - Genus: Tursiops
        - Common bottlenose dolphin, T. truncatus LC
    - Family: Physeteridae (sperm whales)
      - Genus: Physeter
        - Sperm whale, P. macrocephalus VU
    - Family: Kogiidae (dwarf sperm whales)
      - Genus: Kogia
        - Pygmy sperm whale, K. breviceps LC
        - Dwarf sperm whale, K. sima LC
  - Superfamily Ziphioidea
    - Family: Ziphidae (beaked whales)
      - Genus: Mesoplodon
        - Gervais' beaked whale, M. europaeus LC
        - Blainville's beaked whale, M. densirostris LC
        - True's beaked whale, M. mirus LC
      - Genus: Ziphius
        - Cuvier's beaked whale, Z. cavirostris LC

== Order: Carnivora (carnivorans) ==
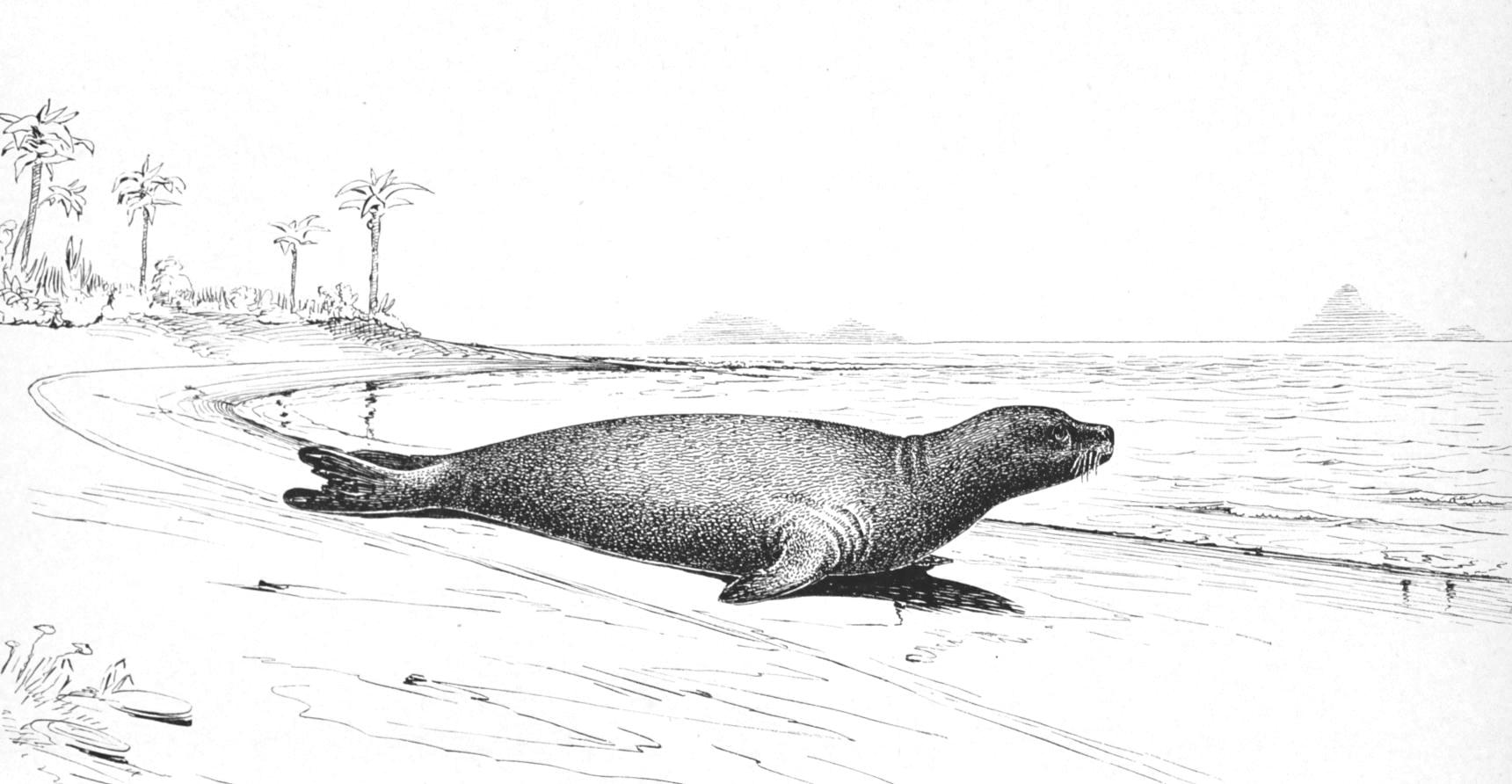
Caribbean monk seal

There are over 260 species of carnivores, the majority of which eat meat as their primary dietary item. They have a characteristic skull shape and dentition.

- Family: Canidae
  - Genus: Canis
    - Feral dog, C. familiaris NE introduced
- Family: Procyonidae
  - Genus: Procyon
    - Raccoon, P. lotor LC possibly introduced, extirpated
- Family: Phocidae
  - Genus: Neomonachus
    - Caribbean monk seal, Neomonachus tropicalis EX
- Family: Felidae
  - Genus: Felis
    - Feral cat, F. catus NE introduced
- Family: Herpestidae
  - Genus: Urva
    - Small Indian mongoose, U. auropunctata LC introduced

== Order: Artiodactyla (even-toed ungulates) ==
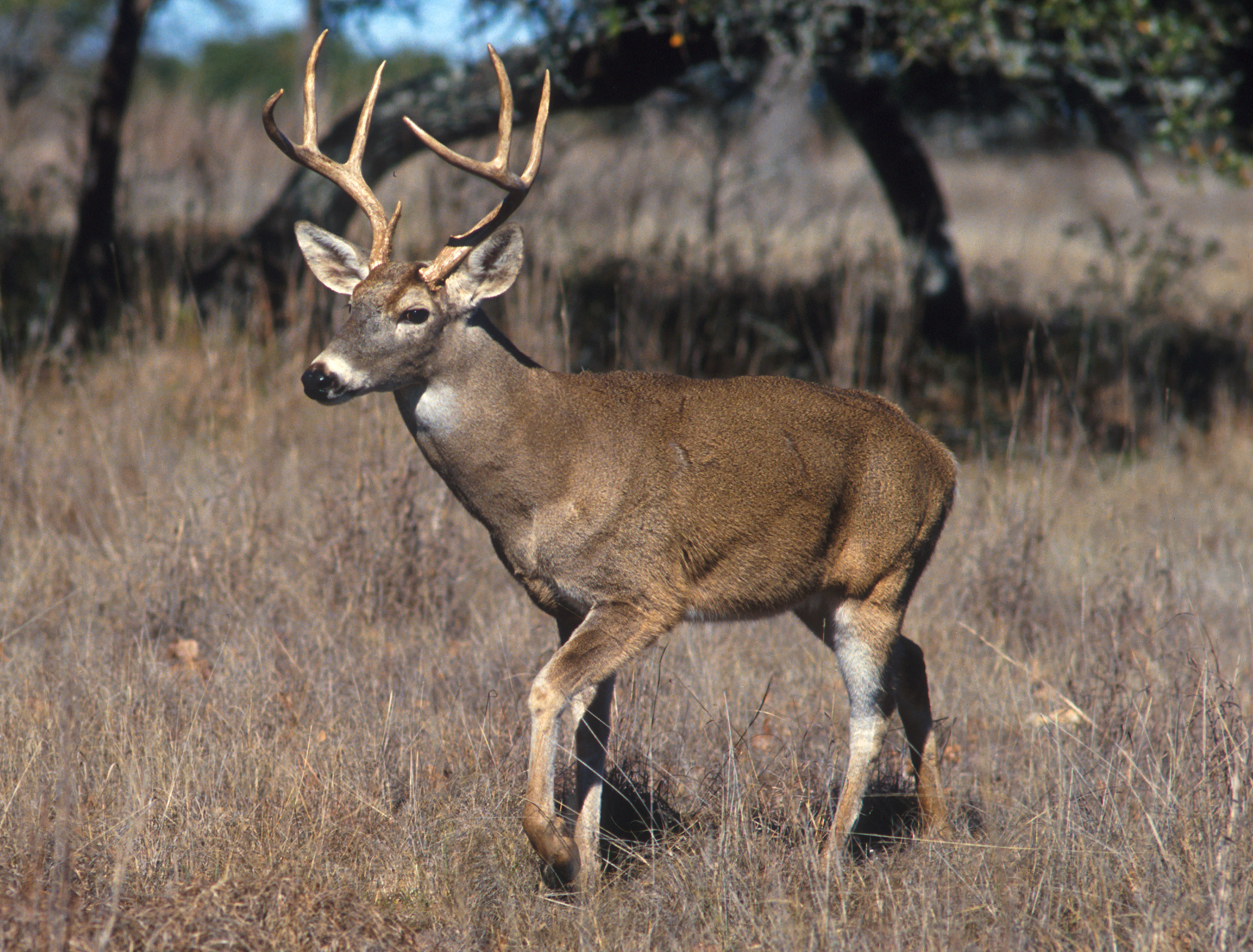
White-tailed deer

The even-toed ungulates are ungulates – hoofed animals – which bear weight equally on two (an even number) of their five toes: the third and fourth. The other three toes are either present, absent, vestigial, or pointing posteriorly.

- Family: Cervidae
  - Subfamily: Capreolinae
    - Genus: Odocoileus
      - White-tailed deer, O. virginianus LC introduced
- Family Suidae (pigs)
  - Genus: Sus
    - Wild boar, S. scrofa LC introduced
- Family: Tayassuidae (peccaries)
  - Genus: Tayassu
    - White-lipped peccary, T. pecari VU introduced, extirpated
- Family Bovidae (Bovines)
  - Genus: Bos
    - Feral cattle, B. taurus NE introduced
  - Genus: Bubalus
    - Feral water buffalo, B.bubalis NE introduced
  - Genus: Capra
    - Feral goat, C. hircus NE introduced

== Human arrival extinctions ==
The following species went extinct when humans arrived to Cuba:

- Oriente cave rat, Boromys offella EX
- Torre's cave rat, Boromys torrei EX
- Cuban coney, Geocapromys columbianus EX
- Western Cuban nesophontes, Nesophontes micrus EX
- Giant solenodon, Atopogale arredondoi EX
- Cuban sloth, Acratocnus antillensis EX
- Cuban giant sloth, Megalocnus rodens EX
- Matthew's ground sloth, Parocnus brownii EX
- Giant ghost-faced bat, Mormoops magna EX
- Anthony's fruit-eating bat, Artibeus anthonyi EX
- Lesser falcate-winged bat, Phyllops vetus EX

== See also ==
- List of chordate orders
- List of prehistoric mammals
- Lists of mammals by region
- Mammal classification
- List of mammals described in the 2000s
