= Pristine mustached bat =

Pristine mustached bat Temporal range: Late Quaternary

Conservation status
- Extinct

Scientific classification
- Kingdom: Animalia
- Phylum: Chordata
- Class: Mammalia
- Order: Chiroptera
- Family: Mormoopidae
- Genus: Pteronotus
- Species: †P. pristinus

Binomial name
- †Pteronotus pristinus Silva-Taboada, 1974

Extinct species of bat

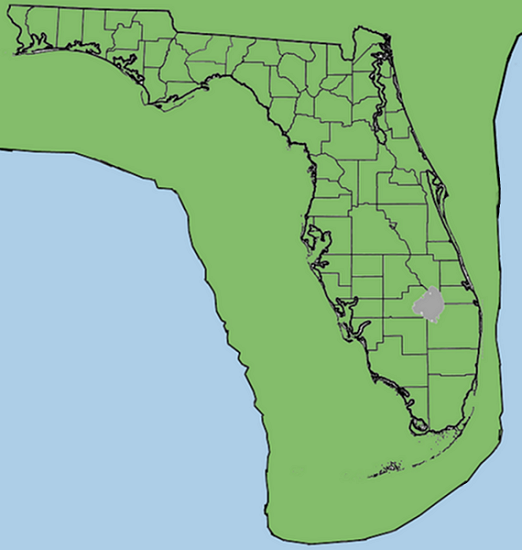
Florida coast about 10,000 years ago, during the early Holocene, just after Pleistocene.

The pristine mustached bat (Note: Mammal Species of the World, 3rd edition (MSW3) - common name probably incorrectly spelled as "Prinstine Mustached Bat" (with insterted "n" character).) (Pteronotus (Phyllodia) pristinus) is an extinct Late Quaternary species of bat in the endemic Neotropical family Mormoopidae. It was distributed in Cuba and possibly Florida (United States).

== Distribution ==
This bat is known only from subfossils. It was described from Late Quaternary cave deposits in Cuba (Las Villas Province, Trinidad, Cueva de los Masones) and found also in Rancholabrean cave deposits in southern Florida (Monkey Jungle Hammock).

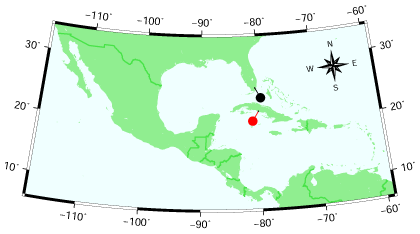
Fossil distribution of the pristine mustached bat. Pteronotus pristinus - red (Trinidad, Cuba), P. cf. pristinus - black (Monkey Jungle, Florida, USA).

Florida specimens (two mandibles) were only tentatively referred to Pteronotus cf. P. pristinus, because they could not be directly compared with the Cuban material (several skulls, postcranial elements), but they may represent P. pristinus.

This is the only occurrence of Pteronotus in the United States, fossil or recent. Cuba is the most likely source for West Indian bats in Florida.

== Extinction ==
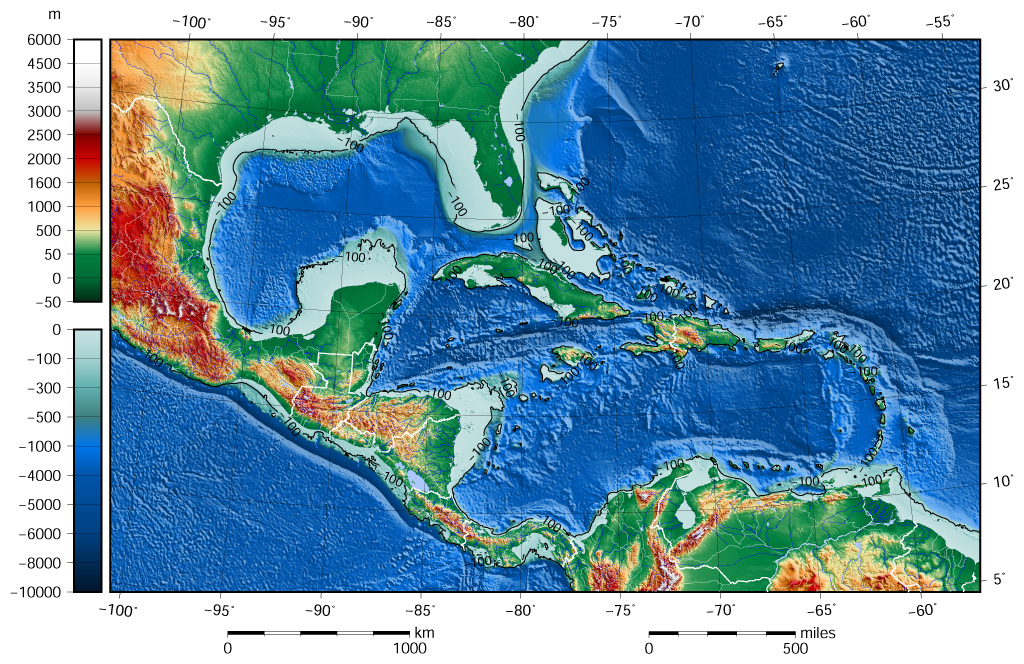
The shaded relief map of the Gulf of Mexico and Caribbean Sea area contoured at -100 m depth.

In Florida, the pristine mustached bat became locally extinct at the end of the Pleistocene, what probably resulted from the rise in sea level, the subsequent flooding of caves and loss of roosting sites.

The sea level in Florida was as much as 100 m lower in late Pleistocene, as well water tables, and cave systems in Monkey Jungle Hammock, Cutler Hammock and Rock Springs were dry. But during the latest Pleistocene the rising sea level caused flooding of these cave systems and destroyed a hot and humid microclimate of so-called hot caves. Currently two first of them are sediment-filled sinkholes few meters above sea level, third one is submerged.

In these three sites in southern peninsula, the sea level stand change presumably was also reason of extirpation of another tropical cave-dwelling bat in the Neotropical family Mormoopidae (extralimital ghost-faced bat Mormoops megalophylla) and one North American species (southeastern myotis Myotis austroriparius) as well. The fourth species - big brown bat (Eptesicus fuscus) became rare in Florida caves.

Such a pattern of extinction or extirpation is known also from many small islands in West Indies (Bahamas, Cayman Islands, Lesser Antilles).
