= Phyllops silvai =

Phyllops silvai Temporal range: Late Pleistocene

Scientific classification
- Domain: Eukaryota
- Kingdom: Animalia
- Phylum: Chordata
- Class: Mammalia
- Order: Chiroptera
- Family: Phyllostomidae
- Genus: Phyllops
- Species: †P. silvai

Binomial name
- †Phyllops silvai Suárez and Díaz-Franco, 2003

Extinct species of bat

Phyllops silvai, also known as Silva's fig-eating bat, is a recently extinct species of bat from western Cuba. It is a close relative of the living Cuban fig-eating bat.

== Chronology ==
It lived during the Late Pleistocene. Radiometric date from a sample of long bones of the extinct barn owl Tyto noeli - directly associated with the type material of P. silvai - gave an age of 17,406 ± 161 YBP. Calibration of the same sample gave ages from 20,050 to 21,474 YBP.

== Diagnosis ==
P. silvai differs from P. falcatus and another extinct relative, P. vetus, by a longer skull, wider postorbital width and long facial region. Its rostrum is larger and upturned with nares dorsally directed, higher than wide.
