= Giant ghost-faced bat =

Giant ghost-faced bat Temporal range: Early Holocene

Scientific classification
- Domain: Eukaryota
- Kingdom: Animalia
- Phylum: Chordata
- Class: Mammalia
- Order: Chiroptera
- Family: Mormoopidae
- Genus: Mormoops
- Species: †M. magna

Binomial name
- †Mormoops magna (Silva-Taboada, 1974)

Extinct species of bat

The giant ghost-faced bat (Mormoops magna) is a prehistoric species of bat that was endemic to the Caribbean. It is only known from fragmental humerus remains, which physically resemble those of Mormoops megalophylla but are larger in size.

This bat species became extinct between 7500-9000 years ago.
