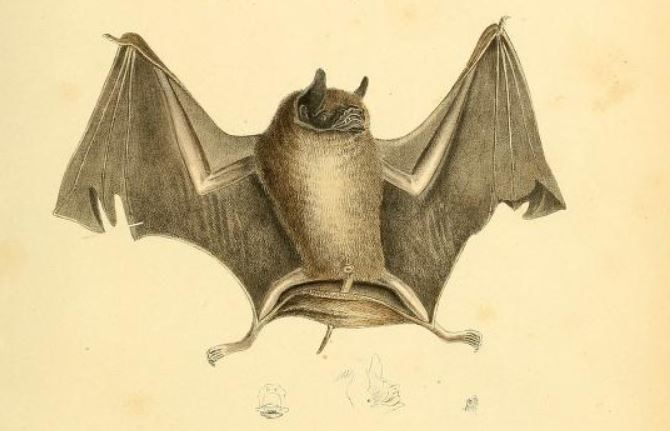

Conservation status
- Least Concern (IUCN 3.1)

Scientific classification
- Kingdom: Animalia
- Phylum: Chordata
- Class: Mammalia
- Order: Chiroptera
- Family: Mormoopidae
- Genus: Pteronotus
- Species: P. gymnonotus

Binomial name
- Pteronotus gymnonotus (Wagner, 1843)

Synonyms
- Chilonycteris gymnonotus Wagner, 1843

= Big naked-backed bat =

Species of bat

The big naked-backed bat (Pteronotus gymnonotus), is a bat species from South and Central America.

== Taxonomy ==
It was described as a new species in 1843 by German zoologist Johann Andreas Wagner. Wagner placed it in the now-defunct genus Chilonycteris. The holotype had been collected in Cuiabá, Mato Grosso, Brazil. Taxon authority is sometimes given to Johann Natterer, however. According to the International Code of Zoological Nomenclature's Principle of Priority, the first author to publish a species name is considered the authority of that name. Smith (1977) hypothesized that Wagner copied Natterer's species description directly from his diary, and thus gave Natterer the authority. Carter and Dolan (1978) stated that Wagner's description was not comparable to Natterer's, which is why they attribute the name to Wagner. The reference texts Mammals of South America and Mammals of Mexico also list Wagner as the authority.

== Description ==
Instead of attaching to the sides of the bat, its wings attach to its back near its spine. This gives individuals the appearance of having a "naked back" due to the lack of fur on their wings. However, its back is furred under the wings. The fur ranged in color from dark brown to bright orange, being lighter on the underparts. The larger of the two species of naked-backed bat, individuals weigh 12–16 g (0.42–0.56 oz) and have a forearm length of 49–56 mm (1.9–2.2 in). The ears are pointed with a smooth edge, and the nose has a flattened, plate-like shape with small warty tubercles over the nostrils and short spikes to either side.

Like all species in its family, it has a dental formula of 2.1.2.32.1.3.3 for a total of 34 teeth.

== Range and habitat ==
Big naked-backed bats are found from southeastern Mexico through the whole of Central America and into Bolivia, Brazil, Colombia, Ecuador, Guyana, Peru, and Venezuela. They inhabit tropical forests and savannah and are usually found at elevations below 400 m (1,300 ft) although they are sometimes found as high as 1,000 m (3,300 ft). They are adapted to hot environments, and are unable to tolerate temperatures below 15 °C (59 °F) for long.

== Behaviour and biology ==
The big naked-backed bat roosts in large, humid, cave systems, often in association with many other local bat species; a researcher reported 50,000 individuals roosting together with other bats in two colonies in a karst landscape in Brazil. They feed on insects, mostly moths, beetles, and orthopterans. Their echolocation calls have been reported to have up to three harmonics, with the most intense starting at 55 kHz and falling to 48.7 kHz. When hunting prey the calls can reach a volume of 130 dB.

The breeding season takes place at different times of the year across their range. Mothers give birth to a single, naked, young which is initially raised in a maternity roost that may be shared with other closely related species.
