= Koopmanycteris =

Koopmanycteris Temporal range: Oligocene

Scientific classification
- Kingdom: Animalia
- Phylum: Chordata
- Class: Mammalia
- Infraclass: Placentalia
- Order: Chiroptera
- Family: Mormoopidae
- Genus: †Koopmanycteris
- Species: †K. palaeomormoops

Binomial name
- †Koopmanycteris palaeomormoops Morgan et al., 2019

Extinct genus of bat

Koopmanycteris is an extinct genus of bat that lived in Florida during the Oligocene epoch. It contains a single species, K. palaeomormoops.
