= Phyllops =

Scientific classification
- Domain: Eukaryota
- Kingdom: Animalia
- Phylum: Chordata
- Class: Mammalia
- Order: Chiroptera
- Family: Phyllostomidae
- Subfamily: Stenodermatinae
- Genus: Phyllops; Peters, 1865

Type species
- Phyllops falcatus (Gray, 1839)

Species
- P. falcatus †P. silvai †P. vetus

Genus of mammals

Phyllops is a genus of bats that includes the Cuban fig-eating bat and two extinct species, both from Cuba as well.
