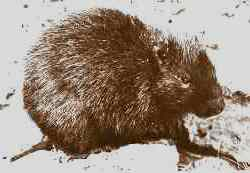

Conservation status
- Critically Endangered (IUCN 3.1)

Scientific classification
- Kingdom: Animalia
- Phylum: Chordata
- Class: Mammalia
- Order: Rodentia
- Family: Echimyidae
- Genus: Mesocapromys
- Species: M. angelcabrerai

Binomial name
- Mesocapromys angelcabrerai (Varona, 1979)
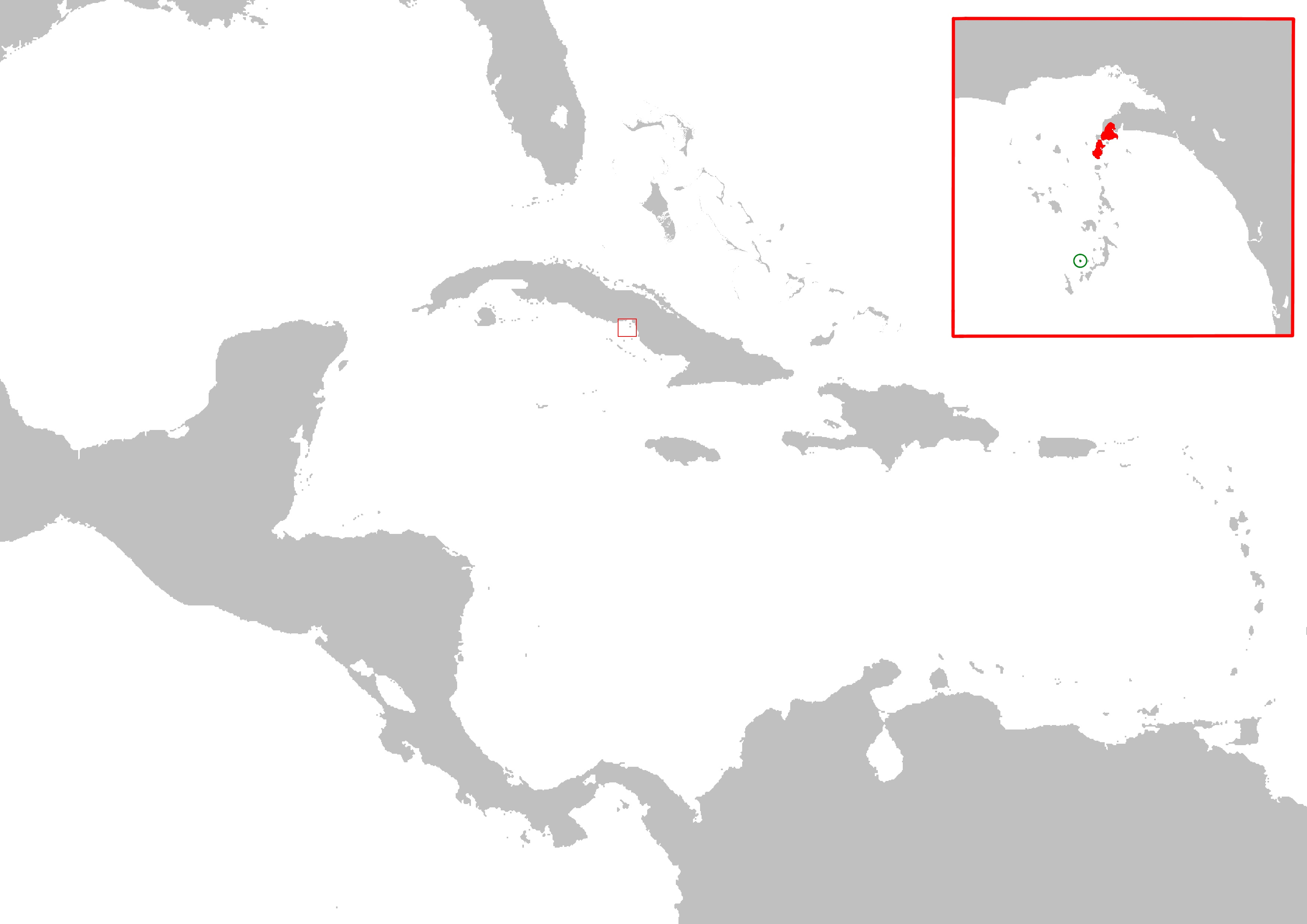
- Red: native Green: introduced

= Cabrera's hutia =

Species of rodent

Cabrera's hutia (Mesocapromys angelcabrerai) is a small, critically endangered, rat-like mammal found only in Cuba. It lives in communal shelters in swamps and coastal mangrove forests, and is threatened by habitat loss. It is a member of the hutia subfamily (Capromyinae), a group of rodents native to the Caribbean that are mostly endangered or extinct.

Its species name, angelcabrerai, is in honour of Spanish zoologist Ángel Cabrera.
