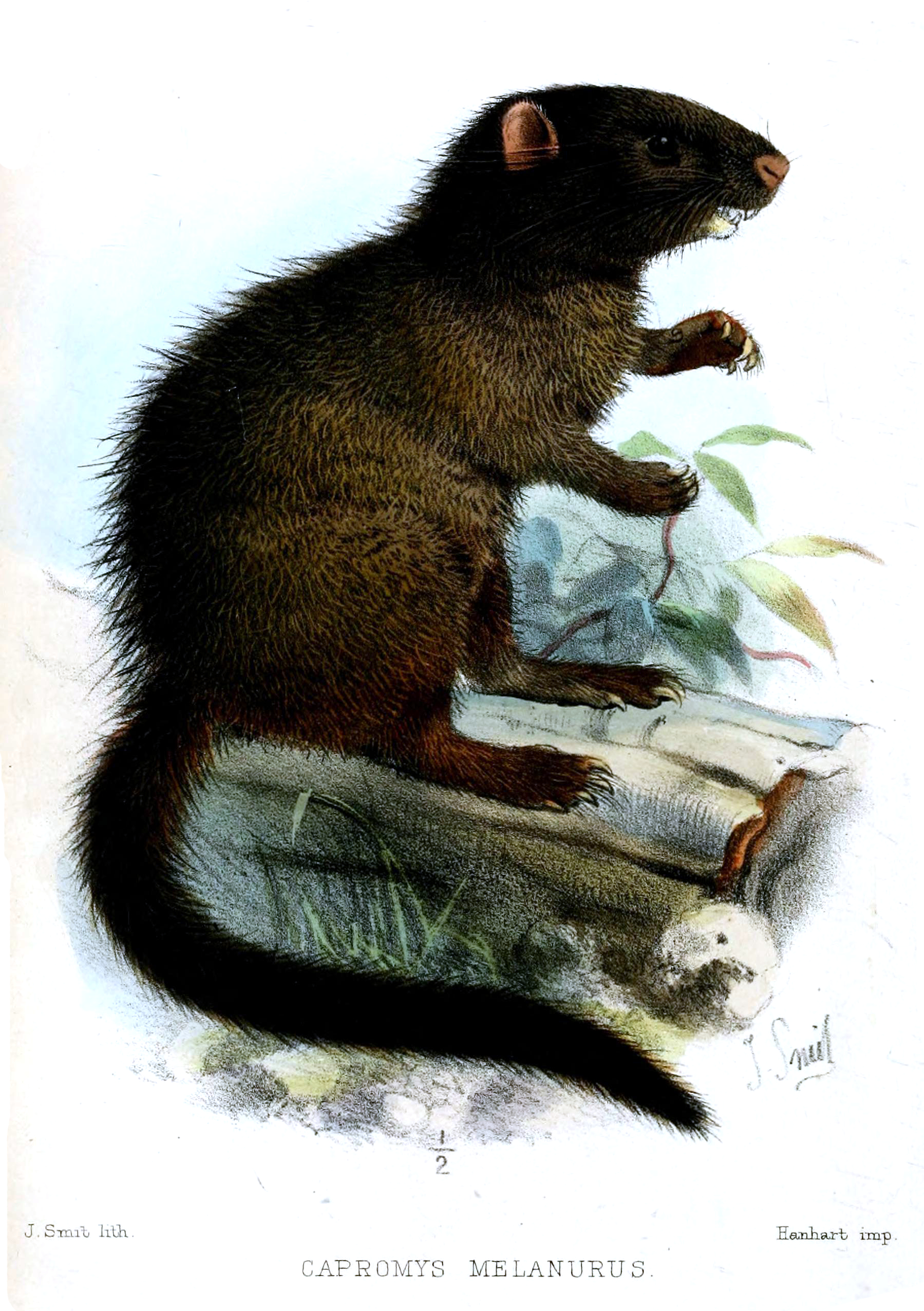

Conservation status
- Vulnerable (IUCN 3.1)

Scientific classification
- Kingdom: Animalia
- Phylum: Chordata
- Class: Mammalia
- Order: Rodentia
- Family: Echimyidae
- Genus: Mesocapromys
- Species: M. melanurus

Binomial name
- Mesocapromys melanurus (Poey, 1865)
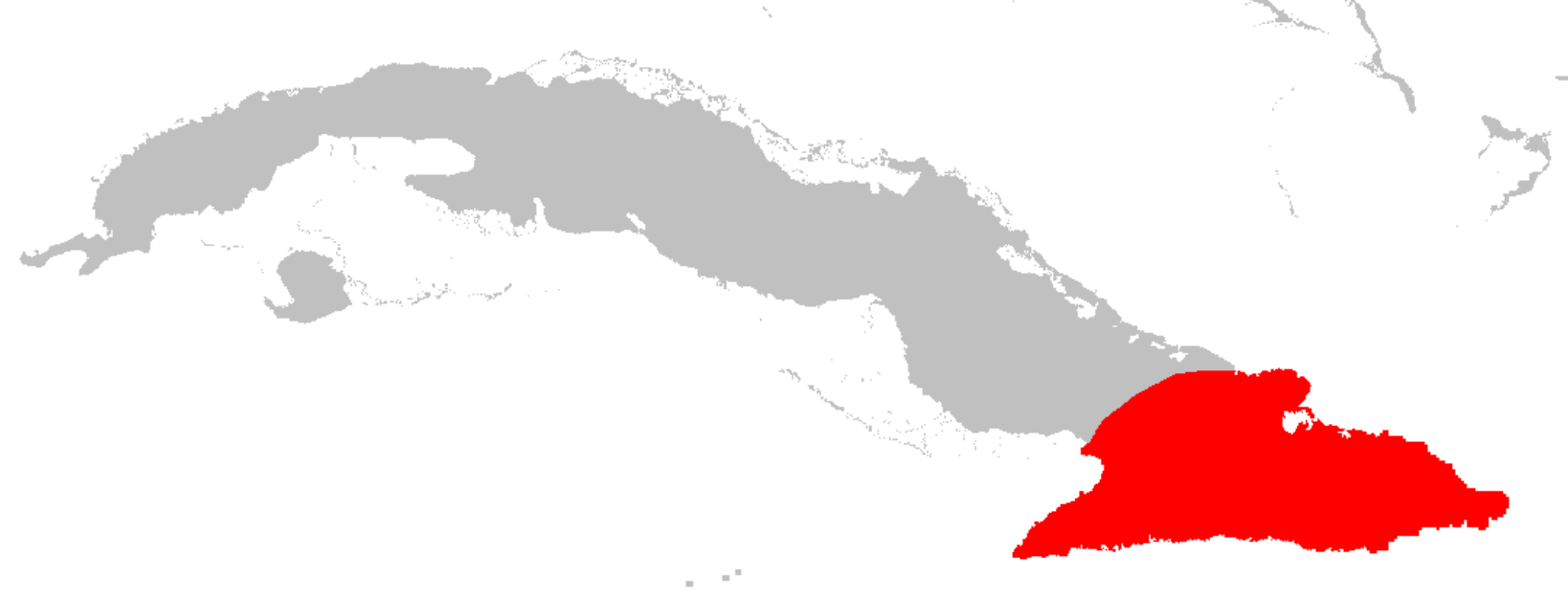

Synonyms
- arboricolus Kratochvíl, Rodriguez, & Barus, 1978; rufescens Mohr, 1839; Mysateles melanurus (Poey, 1865)

= Black-tailed hutia =

Species of rodent

The black-tailed hutia (Mesocapromys melanurus), also known as the bushy-tailed hutia, is a small, furry, rat-like mammal found only in Cuba. It lives in lowland moist forests and is threatened by habitat loss. It is a member of the hutia subfamily (Capromyinae), a group of rodents native to the Caribbean that are mostly endangered or extinct.

Although it was formerly classified in the genus Mysateles, phylogenetic evidence supports it belonging to the genus Mesocapromys.
