= Dwarf hutia =

Conservation status
- Critically endangered, possibly extinct (IUCN 3.1)

Scientific classification
- Kingdom: Animalia
- Phylum: Chordata
- Class: Mammalia
- Infraclass: Placentalia
- Order: Rodentia
- Family: Echimyidae
- Genus: Mesocapromys
- Species: M. nana

Binomial name
- Mesocapromys nana (G. M. Allen, 1917)
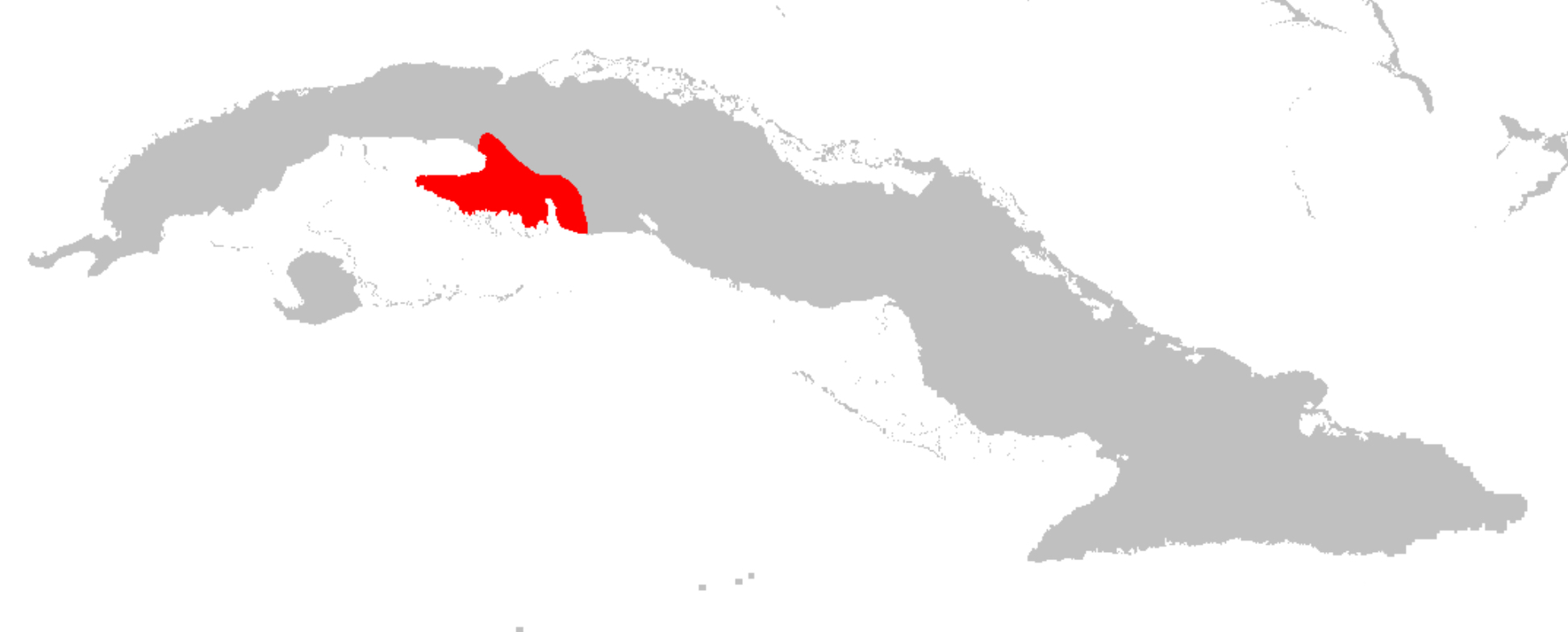

Synonyms
- Mesocapromys nanus

Species of rodent

The dwarf hutia (Mesocapromys nana) is a small, critically endangered, rat-like mammal known only from Cuba. Aside from tracks, it was last seen in 1937 and may be extinct. It gives birth to only a single offspring at a time, and is threatened by habitat loss and non-native species such as rats and mongoose. The dwarf hutia belongs to the hutia subfamily (Capromyinae), a group of rodents native to the Caribbean that are mostly endangered or extinct.

== Description ==
Dwarf hutias are heavily built and chubby, almost guinea pig-like rodents with broad rounded heads. They have relatively small eyes and short rounded ears. The average tail and body length of this hutia is unknown; however, using a taxidermied specimen and comparing it to the closely related Desmarest's Cuban hutia, we can assume that the average size of the dwarf hutia would be 20–30 centimeters in length. Some hutias have prehensile tails, meaning they are able to use them for gripping and climbing. Unlike the larger litter sizes of many other rodents, the dwarf hutia gave birth to only a single offspring.

== Behaviour and habitat ==
Adept tree and rock climbers, most hutias are terrestrial, and none are known to burrow. Instead, they den in tree nests and among tree trunk cavities and roots, as well as in deep rock crevices, caves, and holes in limestone. There are both diurnal and nocturnal species of hutia. The long-tailed Cuban hutias are nocturnal and entirely arboreal and thus rarely descend from tree crowns. They resemble tree squirrels as they run along branches and leap from one tree to another. Hutias eat roots, tubers, leaves, stems, and bark; Desmarest's Cuban hutia also consumes small vertebrates. They obtain all water requirements from their food.

== Conservation ==
The dwarf hutia became Critically Endangered due to loss of habitat and the introduction of mongooses and black rats. The discovery of tracks and droppings in the Zapata Swamp gives hopes that this species has survived. It was initially described based on fossil material, but was later found to be extant. This species is on Re:wild's Search For Lost Species Initiative.
