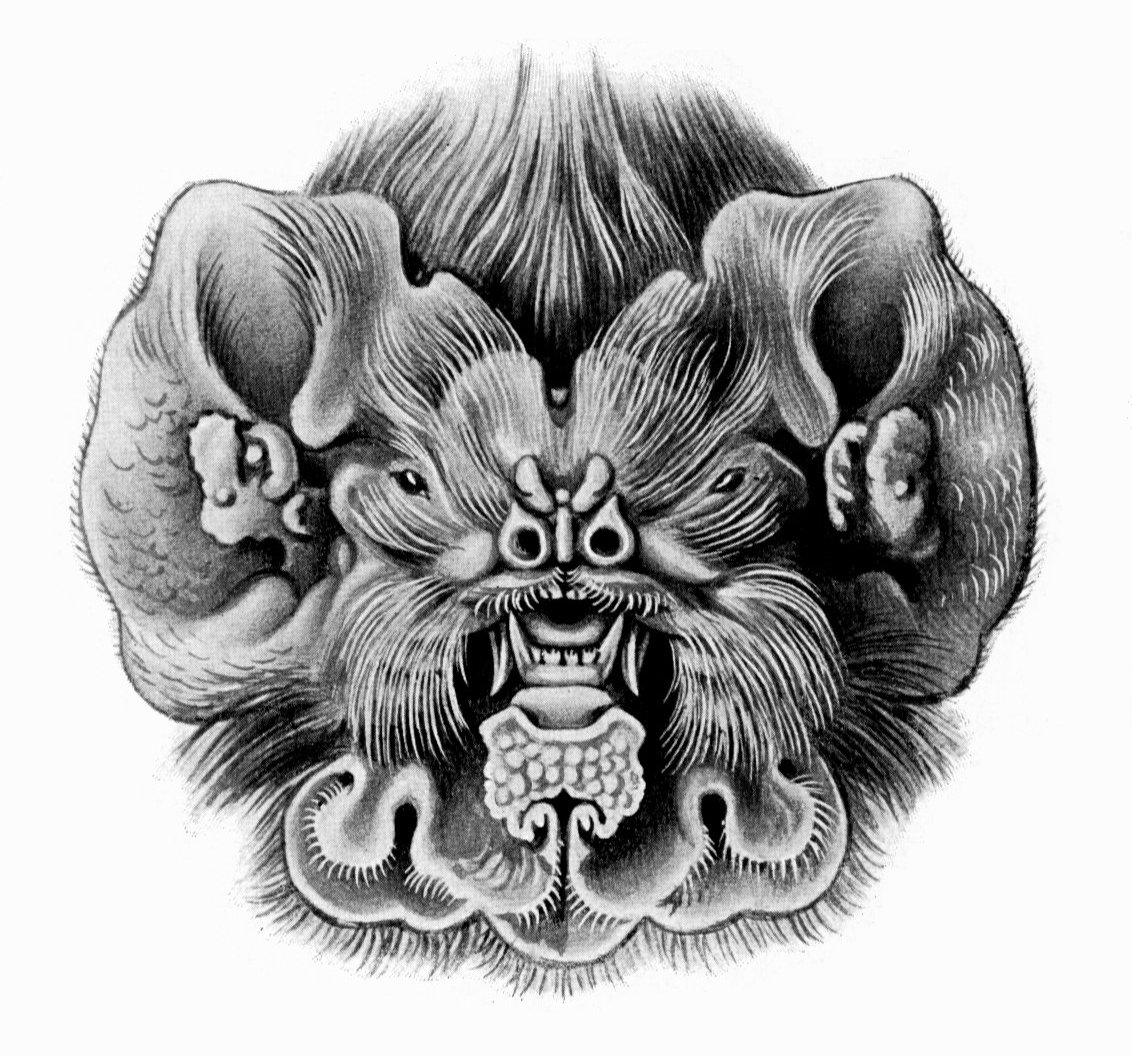
- Antillean ghost-faced bat's face by Ernst Haeckel (1904) (Mormoops blainvillii)

Scientific classification
- Kingdom: Animalia
- Phylum: Chordata
- Class: Mammalia
- Order: Chiroptera
- Family: Mormoopidae
- Genus: Mormoops; Leach, 1821

Type species
- Mormoops blainvillii Leach, 1821
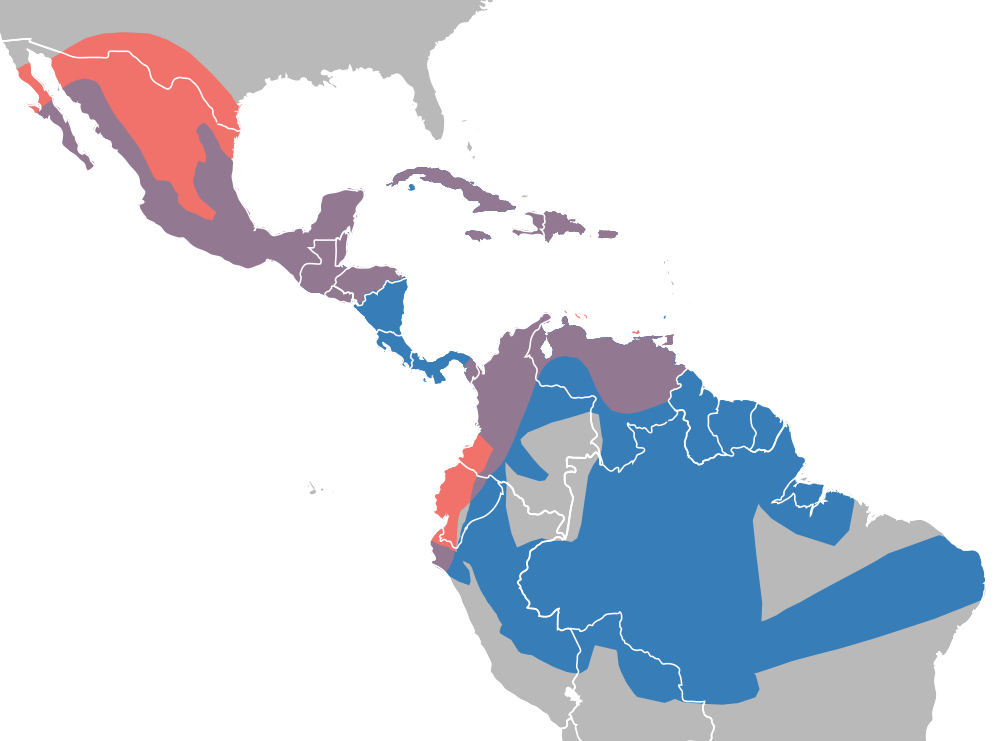
- Mormoopidae distribution Mormoops in red

= Mormoops =

Mormoops Temporal range: Holocene

Genus of bats

Mormoops is a genus of bat in the family Mormoopidae. It contains the following species:

- Antillean ghost-faced bat (Mormoops blainvillii)
- Giant ghost-faced bat (†Mormoops magna)
- Ghost-faced bat (Mormoops megalophylla)
