= Monkey Jungle =

Zoological park in Miami, Florida

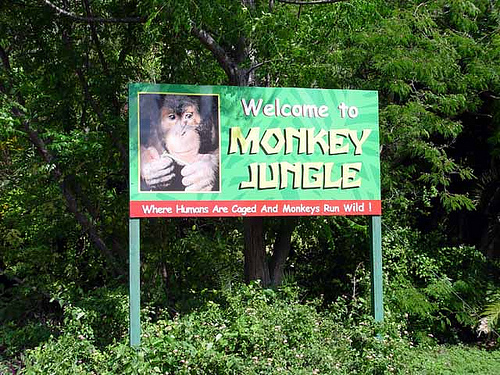
- Interactive map of Monkey Jungle
- 25.566367°N 80.431312°W
- Date opened: 1933
- Location: Miami, Florida, United States
- Website: www.monkeyjungle.com

Monkey Jungle is a 30-acre (12 ha) primatarium and zoological park located in South Miami, Florida. Established in 1933 by Joseph DuMond for the exhibition and study of endangered monkeys in semi-natural habitats after releasing 6 Java macaques into a subtropical forest, the park is now home to over 300 primates.

As the tagline, "Where humans are caged and monkeys run wild!," suggests, the primary experience at Monkey Jungle has guests travel through the park on a caged walkway while different primates roam semi-freely in a natural habitat. Monkey Jungle is one of just a few protected habitats for primates in the United States, and the only one that the public can explore. Guests can embark on trips through a Southeast Asian Wild Monkey Pool & Trail, the Cameroon Gorilla Forest, the Amazonian Rainforest, and visit tropical birds in Wings of Love. Monkey Jungle also provides a home to other animals such as: Lemurs, sloths, turtles, tortoises, and a Rhino iguana.

Monkey Jungle is not accredited by the Association of Zoos & Aquariums. The park has scheduled tours offered three times a day, but attendees can tour on their own.

== History ==
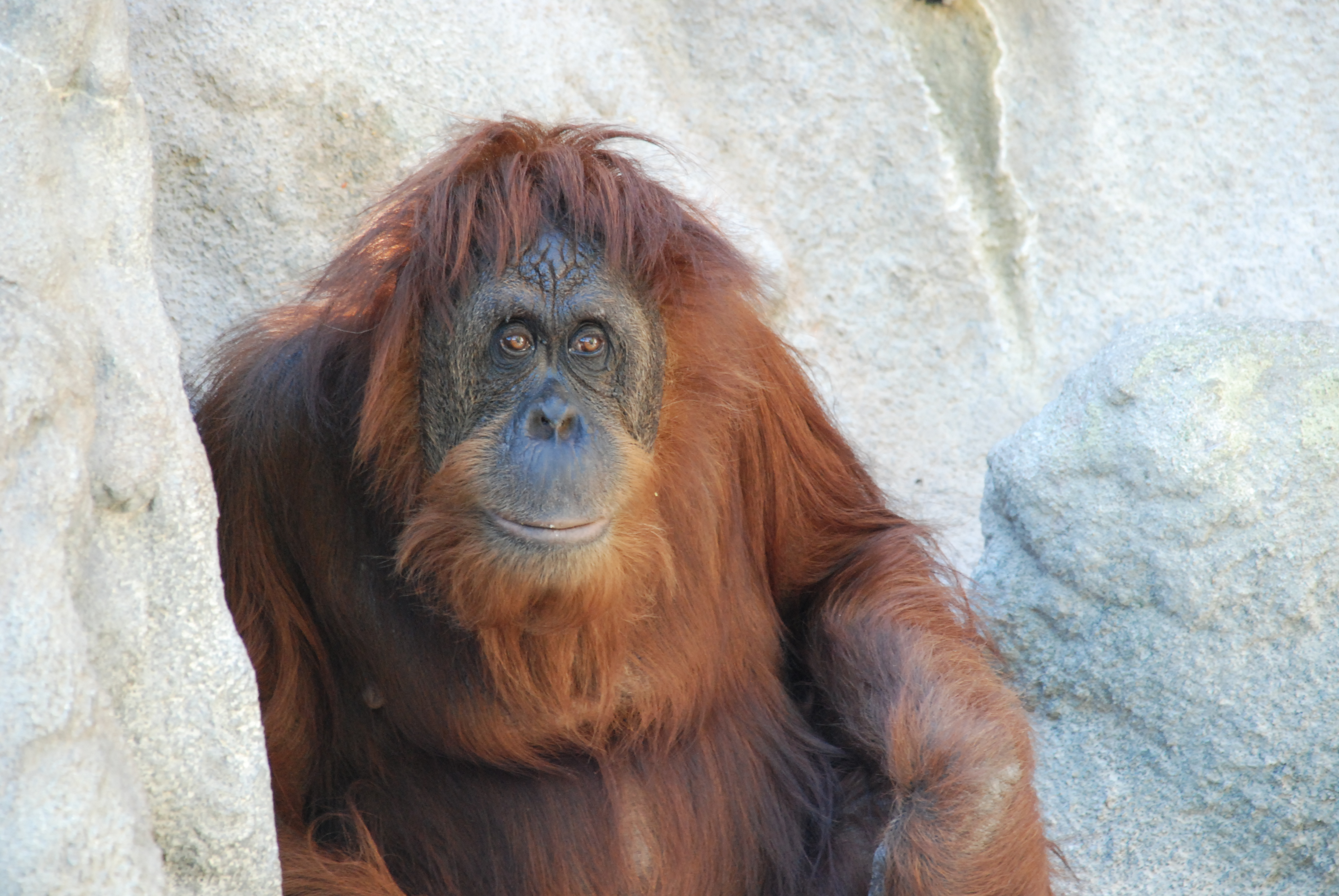
Orangutan in the enclosure.

In 1933, aspiring animal behaviorist Joseph DuMond traveled to South Florida and released six Java Monkeys into a dense tropical forest. Unable to get the government funding that was needed to study these primates, DuMond came up with another idea: open the park to the public. Due to the Java Monkeys being territorial, and the newly introduced wandering guests, the monkeys frequently attacked guests. Not wanting to enclose the monkeys, DuMond came up with the most notable feature of Monkey Jungle: the caging of the guests.

A 1994 archaeological dig led by archaeologist Robert S. Carr unearthed some important and interesting discoveries in naturally occurring sinkholes on Monkey Jungle's property. Fossils aged over 10,000 years old were found at the site, including those from the American Lion, Dire Wolf, Pleistocene horse, and camel. It is one of the largest of such findings anywhere in Florida.

In 1977, King, the sole adult male Western Lowland Gorilla at Monkey Jungle, was the face of a campaign to get him relocated to the Atlanta Zoo, where they have a program that re-socializes gorillas. The campaign grew to be so massive, that it garnered the attention and subsequent involvement of famed primatologist Jane Goodall. In 2001, Monkey Jungle built a much larger enclosure for King.

In 2017, after Hurricane Irma impacted many parts of Florida, four former employees accused Monkey Jungle of animal abuse and mistreatment. The former employees provided photographic evidence of terrible enclosure conditions for Mei, an orangutan that was 32-years old at the time. Pictures of Mei and her enclosure featured rotten foliage and feces all throughout the enclosure as well as on Mei herself. They also provided pictures of a large, oozing, injury on King. One former keeper also said that they encouraged the zoo to allow different healing ointments to be applied to King as he would repeatedly wipe off the ointment that was being used, but the suggestion went largely ignored. The former keeper also stated that besides the corrected enclosure size issue, King was in relatively good spirits. Monkey Jungle soon responded, claiming that the former employees took advantage of the aftermath of Hurricane Irma, and continued on to give their story as to why the conditions were as they were, as well as the different ways that they care for every animal within the park, especially those talked about in the allegations.

== Experiences ==
Along with the ability to walk by and view each area of the park on jungle trails, Monkey Jungle also offers individual experiences and presentations personalized to each area/exhibit.

=== Wild Monkey Swimming Pool & Trail ===
Visiting this exhibit brings guests to the home of the Java Macaques, which are native to Southeast Asia. These monkeys are the soul of Monkey Jungle, being the first primates introduced to the park and accounting for the majority of the primates in the park. This 7-acre exhibit provides the guests the opportunity to see Java Macaques in an environment similar to one that the species thrives in, tropical Southeast Asia. Stick around long enough and guests may even have the opportunity to see them dive into the pond in search of snacks.

Daily presentation times for this exhibit are: 10:00 am, 12:15 pm, 2:30 pm, and 4:30 pm.

=== Amazonian Rainforest ===
The Amazonian Rainforest is a large exhibit that immerses guests into the world of the Amazon Rainforest and is North America's only semi-natural tropical rainforest. Frank DuMond, Joseph's son, spent over 5 years in the Amazon Rainforest, mostly in a 100-mile radius of Iquitos, Peru, collecting a wide range of plants to ensure that the area was as natural as possible. The monkeys here are free to live however they'd like, with no forced human contact. This provides the opportunity for guests to view the monkeys in a very natural way, allowing for some studies conducted here to receive international attention. Three different species of monkeys call this exhibit a home, all of which have helped make an impact in the science community:

Squirrel Monkey - The second most plentiful species in the park, Monkey Jungle's Squirrel Monkeys number around 125.

Black-Capped Capuchin - Of the three different monkey species in the exhibit, the Black-Capped Capuchin can be easily recognized by guests by the raised black fur, or "cap" on the top of their heads. Widely considered to be one of the smartest of all the monkey species, Black-Capped Capuchin's are often involved in programs to assist human quadriplegics.

Red Howler Monkey - The largest of the three monkey species in the exhibit, the Howler Monkey is one of the most unique primates in the entire park. Guests can spot these territorial primates by looking for their distinctive red fur and black face, that is, if they aren't able to locate them by following the sound of the male's roar-like vocalizations that can be heard over a mile away.

Daily presentation times for this exhibit are: 11:30 am, 1:45 pm, and 4:00 pm.

=== Wings of Love ===
Monkey Jungle is home to the Wings of Love Foundation, a non-profit organization that created a sanctuary for captive parrots that have been displaced or can no longer be taken care of by their owners. The birds are housed in large geodesic domes alongside intra-species and inter-species companions. The domes are furnished with natural foliage to add to the well-being and security of the birds.

== The DuMond Conservancy ==
The DuMond Conservancy for Primates and Tropical Forests is the not-for-profit science and education affiliate of Monkey Jungle. The team consists of staff, volunteers, and students who, in partnership with academic institutions and conservation groups, study the primates and their vulnerable habitats utilizing Monkey Jungle's unique environment. The goal of the DuMond Conservancy is to facilitate the understanding of scientists, students, and the public of nonhuman primates and their habitats.

Research focuses on questions regarding primate ecology, biology, and development that are hoped to provide insight into human condition and the means to improve the welfare of nonhuman primate populations. The conservancy's education efforts provide "living lab" training and research opportunities for those interested in primate conservation efforts, such as conservationists, educators, and young scientists. The conservancy partners with NGOs (Non-Governmental Organizations) in nearby countries native to many nonhuman primate species. They also work to engage the public in conservation related efforts. DuMond conservancy is also home to Owl Monkeys that were formerly in research labs. Florida's warm climate allows the conservancy to provide the Owl monkeys a place to range either freely, in a lush, multi-acre forest habitat, or in large, secluded enclosures with lush, natural vegetation.

DuMond Conservancy at Monkey Jungle provides South Florida youth the opportunities to learn about conservation efforts and nonhuman primates in an immersive and inclusive environment. This provides the chance to learn about primates, conservation, and STEM related topics to those who are interested in learning, as well as those who don't typically have the opportunities to do so.
