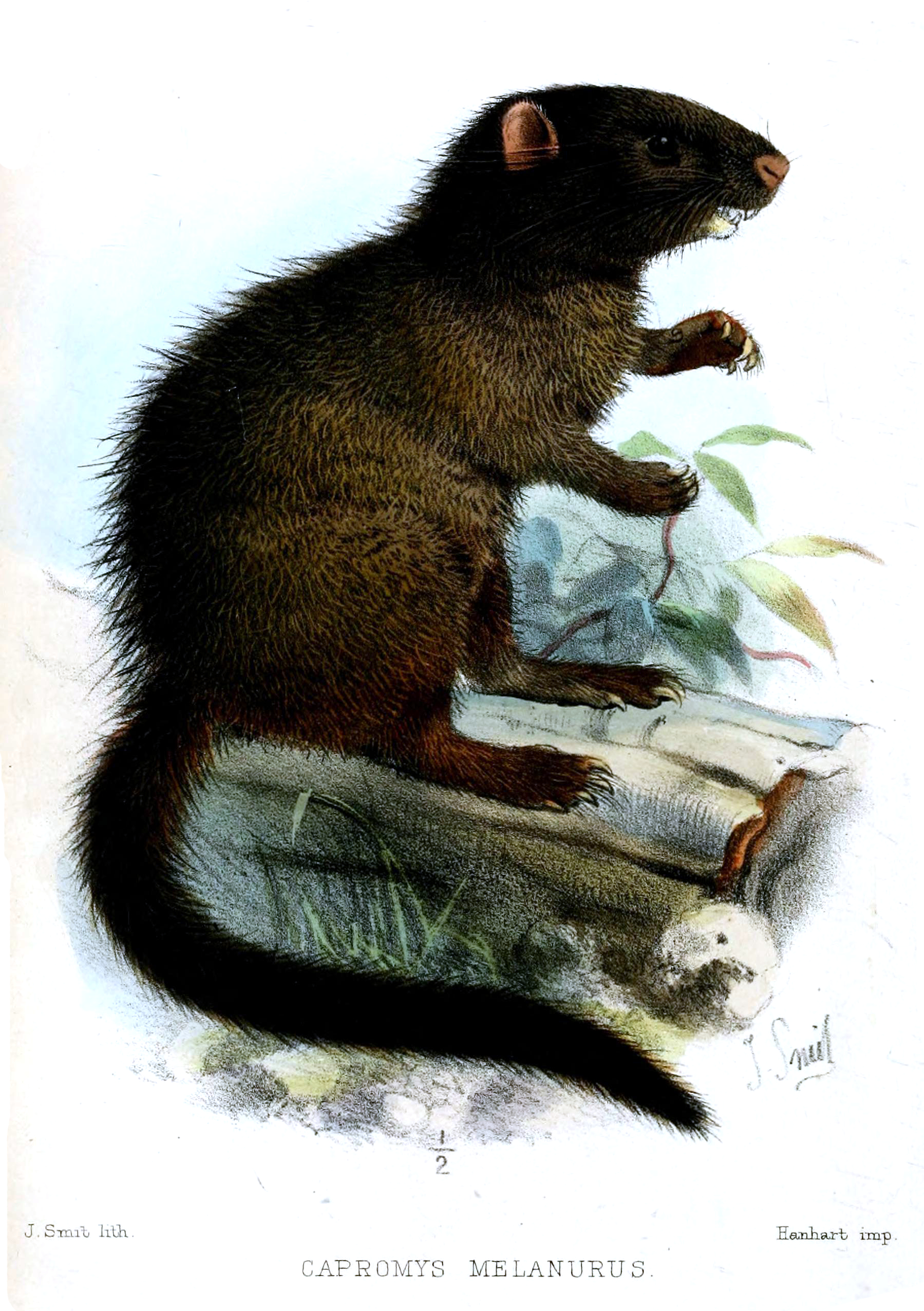
- Black-tailed hutia (Mesocapromys melanurus)

Scientific classification
- Kingdom: Animalia
- Phylum: Chordata
- Class: Mammalia
- Order: Rodentia
- Family: Echimyidae
- Subfamily: Capromyinae
- Tribe: Capromyini
- Genus: Mesocapromys; Varona, 1970

Type species
- Capromys (Mesocapromys) auritus Varona, 1970

Species
- Mesocapromys angelcabrerai Mesocapromys auritus Mesocapromys melanurus Mesocapromys nana Mesocapromys sanfelipensis
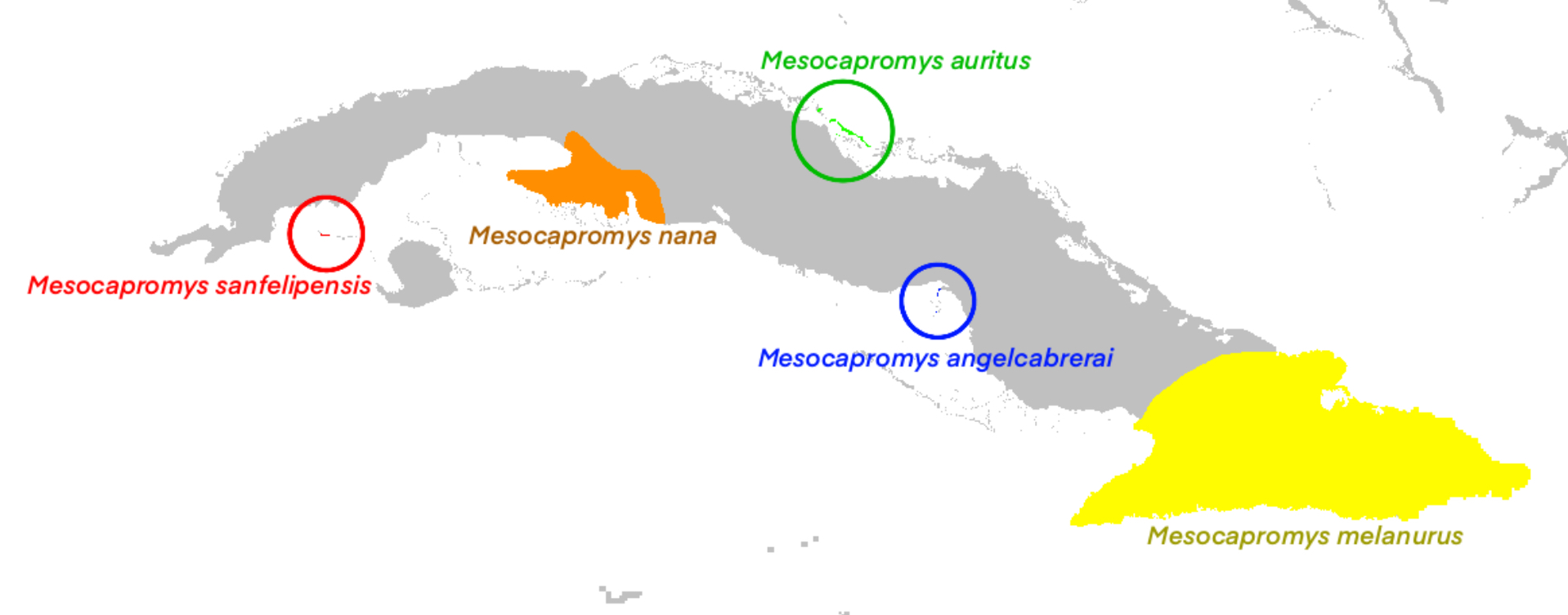

Synonyms
- Paracapromys Kratochvíl, Rodriguez, & Barus, 1978; Pygmaeocapromys Varona, 1979; Stenocapromys Varona & Arrendondo, 1979

= Mesocapromys =

Genus of mammals belonging to the hutia subfamily of rodents

Mesocapromys is a genus of rodent in the subfamily Capromyinae. The genus is restricted to Cuba and associated islands.

== Systematics ==
Mesocapromys contains the five following species:

- Cabrera's hutia (Mesocapromys angelcabrerai)
- Eared hutia (Mesocapromys auritus)
- Black-tailed hutia (Mesocapromys melanurus)
- Dwarf hutia (Mesocapromys nana)
- San Felipe hutia (Mesocapromys sanfelipensis)

== Phylogeny ==
Within Capromyidae, the closest relative of Mesocapromys is the genus Mysateles. Both genera are the sister group to Capromys, and then Geocapromys is a more distant genus. In turn, these four genera belong to the tribe Capromyini, and are the sister group to Plagiodontia.

Genus-level cladogram of the Capromyidae
with their relationship to Carterodon and Euryzygomatomyinae.

- Octodontoidea
  - Euryzygomatomyinae
    - Trinomys (Atlantic spiny rats)
    - - Clyomys
      - Euryzygomatomys (guiaras)
  - - Carterodon (Owl's spiny rat)
    - Capromyidae
      - Plagiodontini
        Plagiodontia
      - Capromyini
        - Geocapromys
        - - Capromys (Desmarest's hutia)
          - - Mesocapromys
            - Mysateles

The cladogram has been reconstructed from mitochondrial and nuclear DNA characters.
