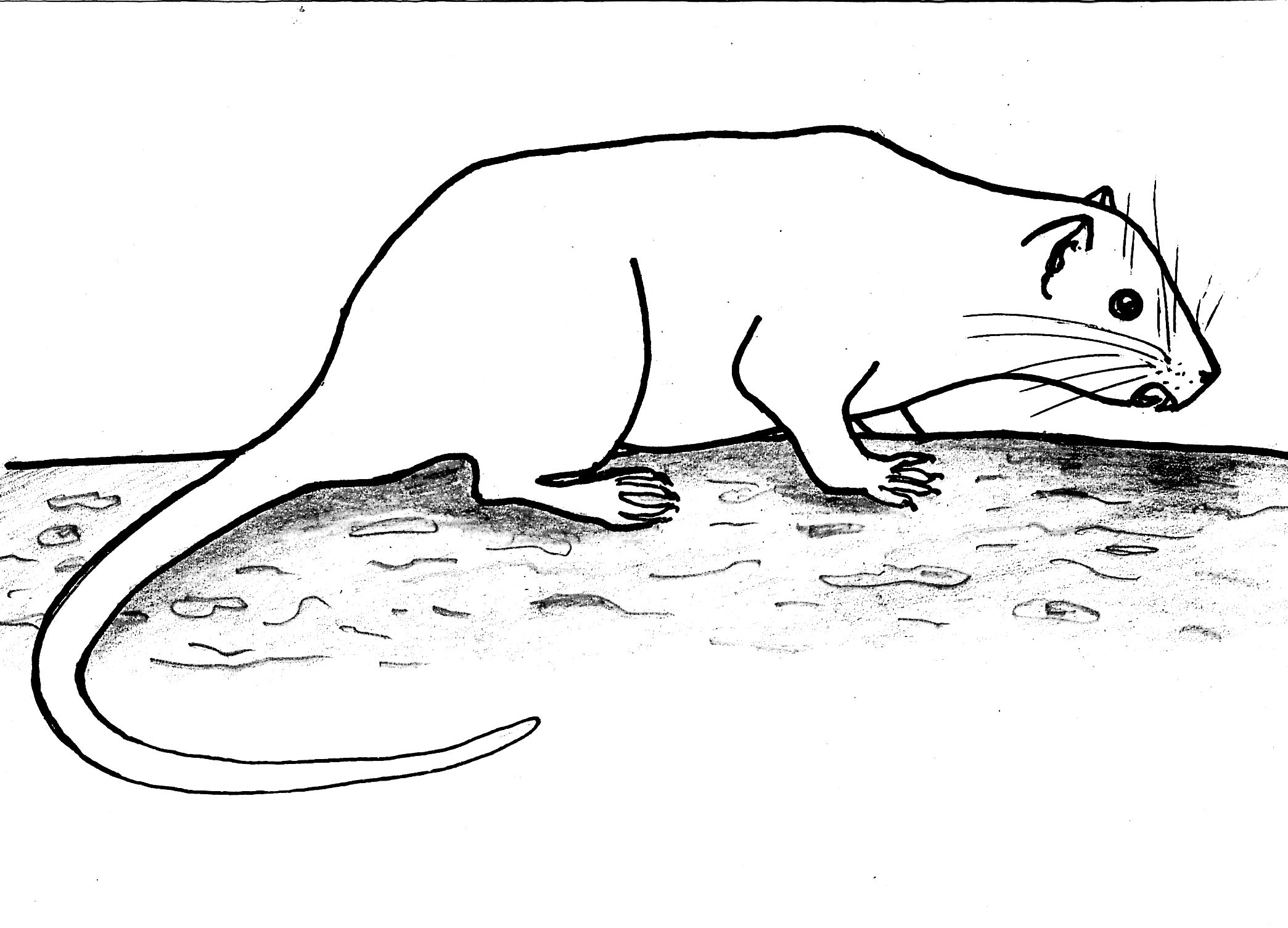

Conservation status
- Critically endangered, possibly extinct (IUCN 3.1)

Scientific classification
- Kingdom: Animalia
- Phylum: Chordata
- Class: Mammalia
- Infraclass: Placentalia
- Order: Rodentia
- Family: Echimyidae
- Genus: Mesocapromys
- Species: M. sanfelipensis

Binomial name
- Mesocapromys sanfelipensis (Varona & Garrido, 1970)
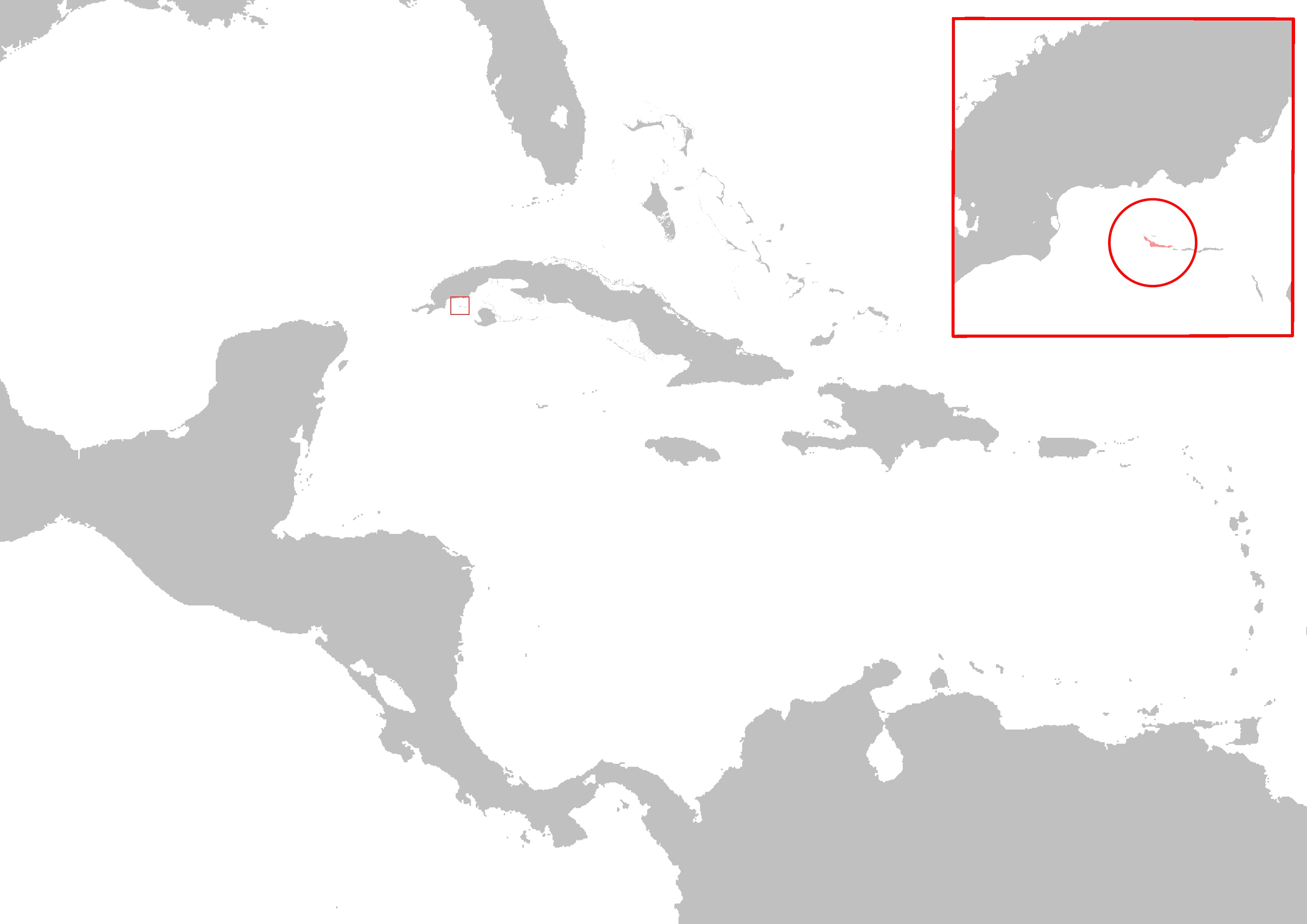

Synonyms
- Capromys sanfelipensis

= San Felipe hutia =

Species of rodent

The San Felipe hutia (Mesocapromys sanfelipensis), also known as the little earth hutia, is small, critically endangered, rat-like mammal found on the small island of Cayo de Juan Garcia off the southwest coast of Cuba. It was discovered in 1970 and is possibly extinct. Little is known about the species, except that it lives in swamps and coastal mangrove forests. It is a member of the hutia subfamily (Capromyinae), a group of stout rodents native to the Caribbean that are mostly endangered or extinct.

The San Felipe hutia lives on Cayo de Juan Garcia and possibly adjacent islands, part of the Cayos de San Felipe located west of Isla de la Juventud.

The San Felipe hutia is a small rodent, with a body length of 8 to 9 in (20 to 23 cm). It has a grayish-brown fur, a short tail, small ears and a thick body. It is nocturnal, and usually forages for food at night. It is believed to live in burrows or rock crevices near water, as well as in mangrove forests.

The San Felipe hutia is believed to feed on a variety of plant material and small invertebrates found in its coastal habitat. It is threatened by introduced predators, habitat degradation and hunting. It is also threatened by introduced plants that can outcompete its native vegetation, as well as rising sea levels that could reduce its habitat. Conservation efforts are currently underway to protect this species, including the protection of its coastal habitat and the introduction of predator controls.
