= Phyllops vetus =

Phyllops vetus Temporal range: Late Quaternary

Scientific classification
- Domain: Eukaryota
- Kingdom: Animalia
- Phylum: Chordata
- Class: Mammalia
- Order: Chiroptera
- Family: Phyllostomidae
- Genus: Phyllops
- Species: †P. vetus

Binomial name
- †Phyllops vetus (Anthony, 1917)

Extinct species of bat

Phyllops vetus is an extinct relative of the Cuban fig-eating bat. Its remains have been found on Cuba and Isle of Pines.

P. vetus was smaller than its living relative. Recent discoveries in Cuba suggest that it survived into the Late Quaternary, perhaps as recently as 2,000 years ago.
