= Mammals of the Caribbean =

A unique and diverse albeit phylogenetically restricted mammal fauna (Note: This article covers all land mammals, including those introduced to the Caribbean, but excludes marine mammals such as whales and manatees. Some ocean mammals are covered by Cetaceans of the Caribbean) is known from the Caribbean region. The region—specifically, all islands in the Caribbean Sea (except for small islets close to the continental mainland) and the Bahamas, Turks and Caicos Islands, and Barbados, which are not in the Caribbean Sea but biogeographically belong to the same Caribbean bioregion—has been home to several families found nowhere else, but much of this diversity is now extinct.

The bat faunas of much of the Caribbean show similarities that led to the proposal of a distinct Caribbean faunal region, bounded by "Koopman's Line". This region excludes several of the region's islands, including the Grenadines, Grenada, Trinidad, Tobago, and other islands near the American mainland, such as Margarita, Isla Escudo de Veraguas, Rosario Islands, Cozumel, and the Florida Keys. The faunas of islands outside Koopman's Line are similar to those of the adjacent mainland, though usually smaller; in contrast, the region inside Koopman's Line harbors relatively few species shared with the mainland and many of its species belong to endemic genera, subfamilies, and even families.

Excluding bats, nearly 90% of the mammals of the Caribbean faunal region have gone extinct since the late Pleistocene, including all the sloths and monkeys, the unique insectivore Nesophontes, two of four species of solenodon, and a variety of rodents including all giant hutias, leaving only a few hutia species extant. Most of these species (the sloths, monkeys, and caviomorph rodents) were of South American origin. The oryzomyine rodents were of ultimately of Nearctic origin, but except for those on Jamaica would also have reached the Caribbean via South America. The origin(s) of the Caribbean eulipotyphlans are uncertain.

Non-flying mammals of Cenozoic origin must have colonized the Caribbean islands by some combination of rafting and/or use of a "land span" (a temporary land bridge connecting South America with one or more off-shelf islands). Colonization of a series of islands can occur either by an iterative rafting process ("island-hopping"), or by colonization of a large ancestral island which is then subdivided by into smaller islands by subsequent geologic or sea level changes (island-island vicariance). The restricted, unbalanced nature of the Caribbean mammal fauna implies that rafting was part of the overall process. This is consistent with the fact that megalonychid sloths, platyrrhine monkeys and caviomorph rodents have all shown a capacity for this type of dispersal (in their colonization of North America from South America prior to the formation of the Isthmus of Panama in the first case, and of South America from Africa in latter two cases). These three groups are known in the Caribbean from fossils as old as the early Oligocene, early Miocene and early Miocene, respectively. Rafting is also consistent with the prevailing flow of oceanic currents from South America towards the islands.

The large proportion of extinctions can be attributed to the isolated and therefore somewhat less competitive nature of the islands' ecosystems, and to the fact that carnivorans never colonized most of the region. These factors made the islands' native fauna particularly vulnerable to disruption by humans and the invasive species they introduced. The large predator niches of the Caribbean islands were formerly occupied by endemic outsize hawks, falcons, caracaras, teratorns and owls, such as Titanohierax, Gigantohierax, Buteogallus borrasi, Caracara tellustris, Oscaravis olsoni, Ornimegalonyx and Tyto pollens - all of which are now extinct. Cuban crocodiles also have more terrestrial habits than other extant crocodilians.

== Opossums ==
Opossums (order Didelphimorphia), the largest group of American marsupials, are of limited diversity in the Caribbean. The large opossum Didelphis marsupialis is found on Trinidad and Tobago and in the Windward Islands up to Dominica, being found on Martinique, Saint Lucia, Saint Vincent, Grenada, and the Grenadines of Carriacou, Mustique, and Bequia. At least some of the latter populations may have been introduced by humans. In Central America, it is also found on the islands of Cozumel, Mexico, and Roatán, Honduras. The smaller Marmosa robinsoni is also known from Trinidad, Tobago, Grenada, and Roatán, but the classification of Central American populations of this species is unclear. In addition, Marmosa murina is known from Trinidad and Tobago, Marmosops fuscatus and Chironectes minimus from Trinidad only, and Caluromys philander from Trinidad and the Venezuelan island of Margarita. A related species, Caluromys derbianus, is known from the small Panamanian island of Escudo de Veraguas.

== Armadillos ==
Armadillos (order Cingulata) include about 20 species, mostly in South America. One species, the nine-banded armadillo (Dasypus novemcinctus) is known from Trinidad, Tobago, and Grenada. An unspecified fossil armadillo has been recorded from Bonaire in the ABC Islands.

== Pilosans ==
The order Pilosa includes the sloths and anteaters, about ten species of which survive in Central and South America. Until the middle Holocene, the Greater Antilles and surrounding islands were home to at least as many species of sloths in four or more genera. All of those are now extinct, with many last appearance dates coinciding roughly with the first arrival of humans. The extinct Caribbean sloths were generally more terrestrial than extant sloths, although not exclusively so. Some other pilosans are still found on islands along the margin of the Caribbean.

== Eulipotyphlans ==
The order Eulipotyphla includes the hedgehogs, gymnures, shrews, moles and desmans, as well as two families known only from the Greater Antilles and surrounding islands. One of the latter, that of the solenodons, includes four known species, two of which are extinct and one of which are endangered, found on Cuba and Hispaniola. Solenodons are only distantly related to other extant eulipotyphlans and may have split from them in the Cretaceous. They are not particularly closely related to the other Caribbean eulipotyphlan family, Nesophontidae; the two groups diverged more than 40 million years ago. The latter family includes about ten species, all extinct, from Cuba, Hispaniola, Puerto Rico and nearby islands, and the Cayman Islands. Several are known to have survived into the last millennium; some species' remains have been found with rat remains, suggesting they survived until European colonization, but their exact extinction dates are unknown.

== Bats ==
Bats (order Chiroptera) are diverse in the Caribbean, with over 60 species known from Trinidad alone. Six families—Phyllostomidae, Vespertilionidae, Molossidae, Natalidae, Mormoopidae, and Noctilionidae—are widespread in the Caribbean and three others—Furipteridae, Thyropteridae, and Emballonuridae—are restricted to islands close to the South and Central American mainland. The family Natalidae, which is most diverse in the Antilles, may have originated in the area and is perhaps the oldest bat lineage of the Caribbean. Some diverse clades in the phyllostomid subfamilies Glossophaginae and Stenodermatinae may also be Antillean in origin. Although bats have not nearly been affected as much by extinctions as other Caribbean mammal lineages, about half of the Caribbean bat species have suffered either total or local extinction in recent times.

== Carnivorans ==
Carnivorans (order Carnivora) are native only to islands at the margins of the Caribbean.

On Trinidad, the tayra (Eira barbara), the neotropical otter (Lontra longicaudis), the ocelot (Leopardus pardalis), and the crab-eating raccoon (Procyon cancrivorus) have been recorded.

Three carnivorans are known from the island of Cozumel off eastern Mexico, all of which are diminutive in size relative to their mainland relatives. The Cozumel coati (Nasua narica nelsoni) is a subspecies of the white-nosed coati, but the raccoon is still classified as a distinct species, the Cozumel raccoon (Procyon pygmaeus). The Cozumel fox, related to the mainland gray fox (Urocyon cinereoargenteus), has yet to receive a scientific name. The kinkajou (Potos flavus) has been recorded a few times, but may not be native to the island. The greater grison (Galictis vittata) has also been recorded, but apparently in error.

Populations of Procyon on New Providence in the Bahamas, Guadeloupe, and Barbados have been regarded as endemic species, but these represent introductions of the common North American raccoon (Procyon lotor). Raccoons were also once present on Cuba, Hispaniola, and Jamaica, probably after being introduced by the Taíno, but were eventually extirpated there.

Similarly, remains of domestic dogs (Canis familiaris) on Cuba have been described as separate genera and species, Cubacyon transversidens and Indocyon caribensis.

The small Indian mongoose (Urva auropunctata) has been widely introduced in the Caribbean from the 1870s onwards; it is known from Cuba, Jamaica, Hispaniola (including Gonâve), Puerto Rico (including Vieques), the U.S. Virgin Islands (Saint Thomas, Saint John, Water Island, Lovango Cay, and Saint Croix), the British Virgin Islands (Tortola and Beef Island), Saint Martin, Saint Kitts and Nevis, Antigua, Guadeloupe (La Désirade and Marie Galante), Martinique, Saint Lucia, Saint Vincent, Grenada, Barbados, and Trinidad.

On Margarita Island off the coast of Venezuela, the only known carnivoran is the ocelot.

The Caribbean monk seal was once native to the Caribbean until they went extinct since the last sighting was in 1952.

== Artiodactyls ==
Artiodactyls include deer, antelope, cattle, pigs, camels, and related species, as well as whales and dolphins. A small form of the collared peccary (Dicotyles tajacu) is known from Cozumel, and it also native to Trinidad. The white-lipped peccary has also been reported, but probably in error. The latter has been introduced to Cuba, but is no longer extant there. The red brocket, a widespread South American deer, also occurs on Trinidad and Tobago. The white-tailed deer (Odocoileus virginianus) has been introduced to several localities in the Caribbean.

== Perissodactyls ==
Perissodactyls are the order of odd-toed ungulates, including horses, rhinos, tapirs and other extinct forms. Fossils of Hyrachyus, a primitive perissodactyl also present in Europe and North America with affinities to early tapirs and rhinos, are known from the Eocene of Jamaica. This species probably reached Jamaica on a block of Central America carried eastward by the motion of the Caribbean Plate.

== Lagomorphs ==
The order Lagomorpha includes rabbits, hares, and pikas. There are few lagomorphs in the Caribbean, and they are either introduced or restricted to islands close to the mainland. The European hare (Lepus europaeus) has been introduced to Barbados. A subspecies of the eastern cottontail (Sylvilagus floridanus margaritae) occurs near Venezuela on Aruba, Curaçao, Margarita, and the Islas de los Testigos.

== Rodents ==
Caribbean rodents (order Rodentia), are diverse, including several families. The fauna of the Greater Antilles mainly consists of caviomorphans, including hutias, giant hutias, and a subfamily of spiny rats (Heteropsomyinae). Of these, only some hutias survive. Oryzomyines, part of a wholly distinct branch of the rodents, are known throughout the Lesser Antilles and on Jamaica, but are now also mostly extinct. Various other rodents have been introduced or are known only from the fringes of the Caribbean region.

== Primates ==
All indigenous primates (order Primates) of the Caribbean are New World monkeys (Platyrrhini), but Old World forms have been introduced. Five monkey species are known from the Greater Antilles, all extinct. They are classified together as the tribe Xenotrichini, which is related to the titis (Callicebus) of mainland South America. Three species—Xenothrix mcgregori from Jamaica, as well as Antillothrix bernensis and Insulacebus toussaintiana, both from Hispaniola — are known from the Quaternary and became extinct relatively recently (with A. bernensis lasting until the 1500s), while two Cuban species more related to the howler monkeys, Paralouatta varonai, and Paraloutta marianae are known from Domo de Zaza, an early Miocene locality on Cuba. Two monkeys, Alouatta macconnelli and Cebus trinitatis, occur on Trinidad. Ateles geoffroyi has been recorded from Cozumel, but probably incorrectly. In the Rosario Islands there are groups of cotton-headed monkeys. Old World monkeys (Chlorocebus sabaeus and Cercopithecus mona) have been introduced to some of the Lesser Antilles. Rhesus macaques (Macaca mulatta) have been introduced to a couple of islands off the coast of Puerto Rico, namely Cayo Santiago and Desecheo Island.

== See also ==
- Island biogeography
- Extinction
- Great American Interchange
- List of mammals of North America
- List of mammals of Mexico
- List of mammals of Central America
- List of mammals of South America
- Lists of mammals by region

The last survivors conservation project

== Literature cited ==
- Brace, S.; Thomas, J. A.; Dalén, L.; Burger, J.; MacPhee, R.D.E.; Barnes, I. & Turvey, S. T. (2016). "Evolutionary history of the Nesophontidae, the last unplaced Recent mammal family" (PDF). Molecular Biology and Evolution. 33 (12): 3095–3103. doi:10.1093/molbev/msw186. PMID 27624716.
- Buisonjé, P.H. de. 1974. Neogene and Quaternary geology of Aruba, Curaçao and Bonaire. Uitgaven "Natuurwetenschappelijke Studiekring voor Suriname en de Nederlandse Antillen" 74:1–291.
- Chapman, J.A., Hockman, J.G. and Ojeda, M.M. 1980. Sylvilagus floridanus. Mammalian Species 136:1–8.
- Cuarón, A.D., Martínez-Morales, M.A., McFadden, K.W., Valenzuela, D. and Gompper, M.E. 2004. The status of dwarf carnivores on Cozumel Island, Mexico. Biodiversity and Conservation 13(2):317–331.
- Defler, Thomas (2019), "Mammalian Invasion of the Caribbean Islands", History of Terrestrial Mammals in South America, Topics in Geobiology, vol. 42, Springer International Publishing, pp. 221–234, doi:10.1007/978-3-319-98449-0_11, ISBN 978-3-319-98448-3, OCLC 1086356172, S2CID 134438659
- Domning, D. P.; Emry, R. J.; Portell, R. W.; Donovan, S. K.; Schindler, K. S. (December 1997). "Oldest West Indian Land Mammal: Rhinocerotoid Ungulate from the Eocene of Jamaica". Journal of Vertebrate Paleontology. 17 (4): 638–641. doi:10.1080/02724634.1997.10011013. JSTOR 4523853.
- Gardner, A.L. (2005). "Order Didelphimorphia". In Wilson, D.E.; Reeder, D.M (eds.). Mammal Species of the World: A Taxonomic and Geographic Reference (3rd ed.). Johns Hopkins University Press. pp. 3–18. ISBN 978-0-8018-8221-0. OCLC 62265494.
- Gardner, A.L. (2005). "Order Cingulata". In Wilson, D.E.; Reeder, D.M (eds.). Mammal Species of the World: A Taxonomic and Geographic Reference (3rd ed.). Johns Hopkins University Press. pp. 94–99. ISBN 978-0-8018-8221-0. OCLC 62265494.
- Gardner, A. L. (2005). "Order Pilosa". In Wilson, D. E.; Reeder, D. M. (eds.). Mammal Species of the World: A Taxonomic and Geographic Reference (3rd ed.). Johns Hopkins University Press. pp. 100–103. ISBN 978-0-8018-8221-0. OCLC 62265494.
- Gardner, A.L., ed. (2008). Mammals of South America, Volume 1: Marsupials, Xenarthrans, Shrews, and Bats. University of Chicago Press. ISBN 978-0-226-28240-4. OCLC 644361912.
- Genoways, H.H., Phillips, C.J. and Baker, R.J. 1998. Bats of the Antillean island of Grenada: a new zoogeographic perspective. Occasional Papers, Museum of Texas Tech University 177:1–28.*Genoways, H.H., Baker, R.J., Bickham, J.W. and Phillips, C.J. 2005. Bats of Jamaica. Special Publications, Museum of Texas Tech University 48:1–154.
- Gompper, M.E., Petrites, A.E. and Lyman, R.L. 2006. Cozumel Island fox (Urocyon sp.) dwarfism and possible divergence history based on subfossil bones. Journal of Zoology 270:72–77.
- Groves, C. P. (2005). "Order Primates". In Wilson, D. E.; Reeder, D. M (eds.). Mammal Species of the World: A Taxonomic and Geographic Reference (3rd ed.). Johns Hopkins University Press. pp. 111–184. ISBN 978-0-8018-8221-0. OCLC 62265494.
- Groves, C.; Grubb, P. (2011). Ungulate Taxonomy. JHU Press. ISBN 978-1-4214-0093-8. OCLC 708357723.
- Grubb, P. (2005). "Order Perissodactyla". In Wilson, D.E.; Reeder, D.M (eds.). Mammal Species of the World: A Taxonomic and Geographic Reference (3rd ed.). Johns Hopkins University Press. pp. 629–636. ISBN 978-0-8018-8221-0. OCLC 62265494.
- Hedges, S. Blair (2006-08-23). "Paleogrography of the Antilles and Origin of West Indian Terrestrial Vertebrates". Annals of the Missouri Botanical Garden. 93 (2). Missouri Botanical Garden: 231–244. doi:10.3417/0026-6493(2006)93[231:POTAAO]2.0.CO;2. S2CID 198149958.
- Helgen, K.M. and Wilson, D.E. 2003. Taxonomic status and conservation relevance of the raccoons (Procyon spp.) of the West Indies. Journal of Zoology, London 259:69–76.
- Horst, G. R.; Hoagland, D.B.; Kilpatrick, W.C. (2001). "The mongoose in the West Indies: The biogeography and population biology of an introduced species". In Woods, C. A.; Sergile, F. E. (eds.). Biogeography of the West Indies: Patterns and Perspectives. Boca Raton, London, New York, and Washington, D.C.: CRC Press. pp. 409–424. doi:10.1201/9781420039481-21. ISBN 978-0-8493-2001-9.
- Hutterer, R. (2005). "Order Soricomorpha". In Wilson, D.E.; Reeder, D.M (eds.). Mammal Species of the World: A Taxonomic and Geographic Reference (3rd ed.). Johns Hopkins University Press. pp. 220–311. ISBN 978-0-8018-8221-0. OCLC 62265494.
- Jones, J.K., Jr., and Lawlor, T.E. 1965. Mammals from Isla Cozumel, México, with description of a new species of harvest mouse. University of Kansas Publications, Museum of Natural History 16:409–419.
- MacPhee, R.D.E. and Grimaldi, D.A. 1996. Mammal bones in Dominican amber. Nature 380:489–490.
- MacPhee, R.D.E. and Meldrum, J. 2006. Postcranial remains of the extinct monkeys of the Greater Antilles, with evidence for semiterrestriality in Paralouatta. American Museum Novitates 3516:1–65.
- MacPhee, R.D.E., Flemming, C. and Lunde, D.P. 1999. "Last occurrence" of the Antillean insectivoran Nesophontes: New radiometric dates and their interpretation. American Museum Novitates 3261:1–20.
- Morgan, G.S. (2001). "Patterns of extinction in West Indian bats". In Woods, C. A.; Sergile, F. E. (eds.). Biogeography of the West Indies: Patterns and Perspectives. Boca Raton, London, New York, and Washington, D.C.: CRC Press. pp. 369–407. doi:10.1201/9781420039481-20. ISBN 978-0-8493-2001-9.
- Morgan, G.S. and Woods, C.A. 1986. Extinction and the zoogeography of West Indian land mammals. Biological Journal of the Linnean Society 28:167–203.
- Ottenwalder, J.A. (2001). "Systematics and biogeography of the West Indian genus Solenodon". In Woods, C. A.; Sergile, F. E. (eds.). Biogeography of the West Indies: Patterns and Perspectives. Boca Raton, London, New York, and Washington, D.C.: CRC Press. pp. 253–330. doi:10.1201/9781420039481-16. ISBN 978-0-8493-2001-9.
- Reyna-Hurtado, R., Taber, A., Altrichter, M., Fragoso, J., Keuroghlian, A. & Beck, H. 2008. Tayassu pecari. In IUCN. IUCN Red List of Threatened Species. Version 2009.2. <www.iucnredlist.org>. Downloaded on November 27, 2009.
- Roca, A.L., Bar-Gal, G., Eizirik, E., Helgen, K.M., Maria, R., Springer, M.S., O'Brien, S.J. and Murphy, W.J. 2004. Mesozoic origin for West Indian insectivores. Nature 429:649–651
- Simmons, N.B. (2005). "Order Chiroptera". In Wilson, D.E.; Reeder, D.M (eds.). Mammal Species of the World: A Taxonomic and Geographic Reference (3rd ed.). Johns Hopkins University Press. pp. 312–529. ISBN 978-0-8018-8221-0. OCLC 62265494.
- Smith, A.T. and Johnston, C.H. 2008. Lepus europaeus. In IUCN. IUCN Red List of Threatened Species. Version 2009.2. <www.iucnredlist.org>. Downloaded on November 27, 2009.
- Solari, S., Soriano, P., Lew, D., Patterson, B. and Reid, F. 2008. Marmosa robinsoni. In IUCN. IUCN Red List of Threatened Species. Version 2009.2. <www.iucnredlist.org>. Downloaded on November 27, 2009.
- Timm, R.M. and Genoways, H.H. 2003. West Indian mammals from the Albert Schwartz collection: Biological and historical information. Scientific Papers, Natural History Museum, The University of Kansas 29:1–47.
- Turvey, S.T. 2009. Holocene Extinctions. Oxford University Press US, 352 pp. ISBN 978-0-19-953509-5
- Whidden, H.P.; Asher, R.J. (2001). "The origin of the Greater Antillean insectivorans". In Woods, C. A.; Sergile, F. E. (eds.). Biogeography of the West Indies: Patterns and Perspectives. Boca Raton, London, New York, and Washington, D.C.: CRC Press. pp. 237–252. doi:10.1201/9781420039481-15. ISBN 978-0-8493-2001-9.
- White, J. L. 1993. Indicators of Locomotor Habits in Xenarthrans: Evidence for Locomotor Heterogeneity Among Fossil Sloths. Journal of Vertebrate Paleontology 13: 230–242.
- White, J.L.; MacPhee, R.D.E. (2001). "The sloths of the West Indies: a systematic and phylogenetic review". In Woods, C. A.; Sergile, F. E. (eds.). Biogeography of the West Indies: Patterns and Perspectives. Boca Raton, London, New York, and Washington, D.C.: CRC Press. pp. 201–235. doi:10.1201/9781420039481-14. ISBN 978-0-8493-2001-9.
- Woods, C.A.; Kilpatrick, C.W. (2005). "Infraorder Hystricognathi". In Wilson, D.E.; Reeder, D.M (eds.). Mammal Species of the World: A Taxonomic and Geographic Reference (3rd ed.). Johns Hopkins University Press. pp. 1538–1600. ISBN 978-0-8018-8221-0. OCLC 62265494.
List of mammals of Mexico
