= List of mammals of Jamaica =

This is a list of the mammal species recorded in Jamaica. Of the mammal species in Jamaica, one is endangered, four are vulnerable, and two are considered to be extinct.

The following tags are used to highlight each species' conservation status as assessed by the International Union for Conservation of Nature:

EX	Extinct	No reasonable doubt that the last individual has died.
EW	Extinct in the wild	Known only to survive in captivity or as a naturalized populations well outside its previous range.
CR	Critically endangered	The species is in imminent risk of extinction in the wild.
EN	Endangered	The species is facing an extremely high risk of extinction in the wild.
VU	Vulnerable	The species is facing a high risk of extinction in the wild.
NT	Near threatened	The species does not meet any of the criteria that would categorise it as risking extinction but it is likely to do so in the future.
LC	Least concern	There are no current identifiable risks to the species.
DD	Data deficient	There is inadequate information to make an assessment of the risks to this species.

Some species were assessed using an earlier set of criteria. Species assessed using this system have the following instead of near threatened and least concern categories:

LR/cd	Lower risk/conservation dependent	Species which were the focus of conservation programmes and may have moved into a higher risk category if that programme was discontinued.
LR/nt	Lower risk/near threatened	Species which are close to being classified as vulnerable but are not the subject of conservation programmes.
LR/lc	Lower risk/least concern	Species for which there are no identifiable risks.

== Order: Sirenia (manatees and dugongs) ==
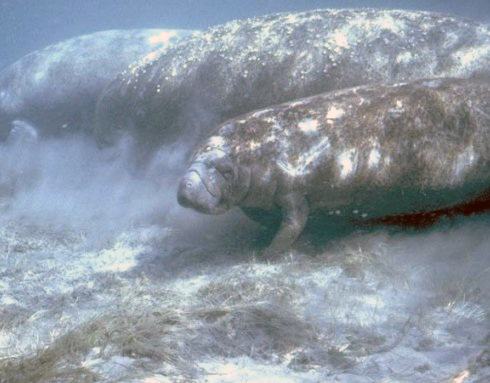
West Indian manatees

Sirenia is an order of fully aquatic, herbivorous mammals that inhabit rivers, estuaries, coastal marine waters, swamps, and marine wetlands. All four species are endangered.

- Family: Trichechidae
  - Genus: Trichechus
    - West Indian manatee, T. manatus VU

== Order: Primates (primates) ==
There are 190 – 448 species of living primates, depending on which classification is used. They have an opposable thumb for grasping objects.

- Suborder: Haplorhini
  - Infraorder: Simiiformes
    - Family: Pitheciidae
      - Subfamily: Callicebinae
        - Tribe: Xenotrichini
          - Genus: Xenothrix
            - Jamaican monkey, X. mcgregori EX

== Order: Rodentia (rodents) ==
Rodents make up the largest order of mammals, with over 40% of mammalian species. They have two incisors in the upper and lower jaw which grow continually and must be kept short by gnawing. Most rodents are small though the capybara can weigh up to 45 kg (99 lb).

- Suborder: Hystricomorpha
  - Family: Capromyidae
    - Subfamily: Capromyinae
      - Genus: Geocapromys
        - Jamaican coney, Geocapromys brownii VU
- Suborder: Myomorpha
  - Family: Cricetidae
    - Subfamily: Sigmodontinae
      - Genus: Oryzomys
        - Jamaican rice rat, Oryzomys antillarum EX
- Suborder: Muridae
  - Family: Muridae
      - Genus: Rattus
        - Brown rat, Rattus norvegicus LC introduced
        - Black rat, Rattus rattus LC introduced
      - Genus: Mus
        - House mouse, Mus musculus LC introduced

== Order: Chiroptera (bats) ==
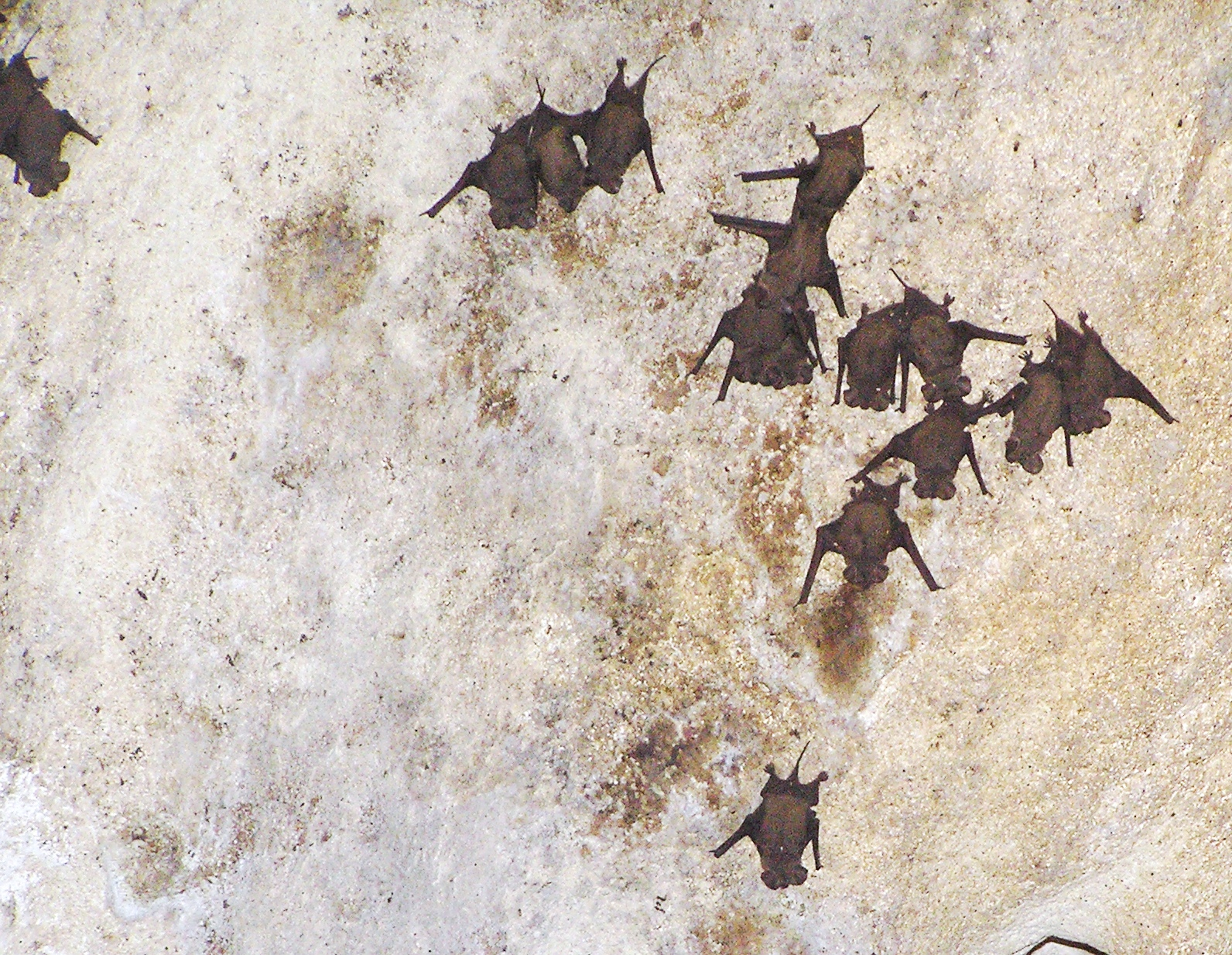
Mexican free-tailed bats

The bats' most distinguishing feature is that their forelimbs are developed as wings, making them the only mammals capable of flight. Bat species account for about 20% of all mammals.

- Family: Noctilionidae
  - Genus: Noctilio
    - Greater bulldog bat, Noctilio leporinus LR/lc
- Family: Vespertilionidae
  - Subfamily: Vespertilioninae
    - Genus: Lasiurus
      - Eastern red bat, Lasiurus borealis LR/lc
- Family: Molossidae
  - Genus: Eumops
    - Wagner's bonneted bat, Eumops glaucinus LR/lc
  - Genus: Molossus
    - Velvety free-tailed bat, Molossus molossus LR/lc
  - Genus: Nyctinomops
    - Big free-tailed bat, Nyctinomops macrotis LR/lc
  - Genus: Tadarida
    - Mexican free-tailed bat, Tadarida brasiliensis LR/nt
- Family: Mormoopidae
  - Genus: Mormoops
    - Antillean ghost-faced bat, Mormoops blainvillii LR/nt
  - Genus: Pteronotus
    - Macleay's mustached bat, Pteronotus macleayii VU
    - Parnell's mustached bat, Pteronotus parnellii LR/lc
    - Sooty mustached bat, Pteronotus quadridens LR/nt
- Family: Phyllostomidae
  - Subfamily: Phyllostominae
    - Genus: Macrotus
      - Waterhouse's leaf-nosed bat, Macrotus waterhousii LR/lc
    - Genus: Vampyrum
      - Spectral bat, Vampyrum spectrum LR/nt
  - Subfamily: Brachyphyllinae
    - Genus: Brachyphylla
      - Cuban fruit-eating bat, Brachyphylla nana LC extirpated
  - Subfamily: Phyllonycterinae
    - Genus: Erophylla
      - Buffy flower bat, Erophylla sezekorni LR/lc
    - Genus: Phyllonycteris
      - Jamaican flower bat, Phyllonycteris aphylla EN
  - Subfamily: Glossophaginae
    - Genus: Glossophaga
      - Pallas's long-tongued bat, Glossophaga soricina LR/lc
    - Genus: Monophyllus
      - Leach's single leaf bat, Monophyllus redmani LR/lc
  - Subfamily: Carolliinae
    - Genus: Carollia
      - Seba's short-tailed bat, Carollia perspicillata LR/lc
  - Subfamily: Stenodermatinae
    - Genus: Ariteus
      - Jamaican fig-eating bat, Ariteus flavescens VU
    - Genus: Artibeus
      - Jamaican fruit bat, Artibeus jamaicensis LR/lc
    - Genus: Sturnira
      - Little yellow-shouldered bat, Sturnira lilium LR/lc
- Family: Natalidae
  - Genus: Chilonatalus
    - Cuban funnel-eared bat, Chilonatalus micropus LR/lc

== Order: Cetacea (whales) ==
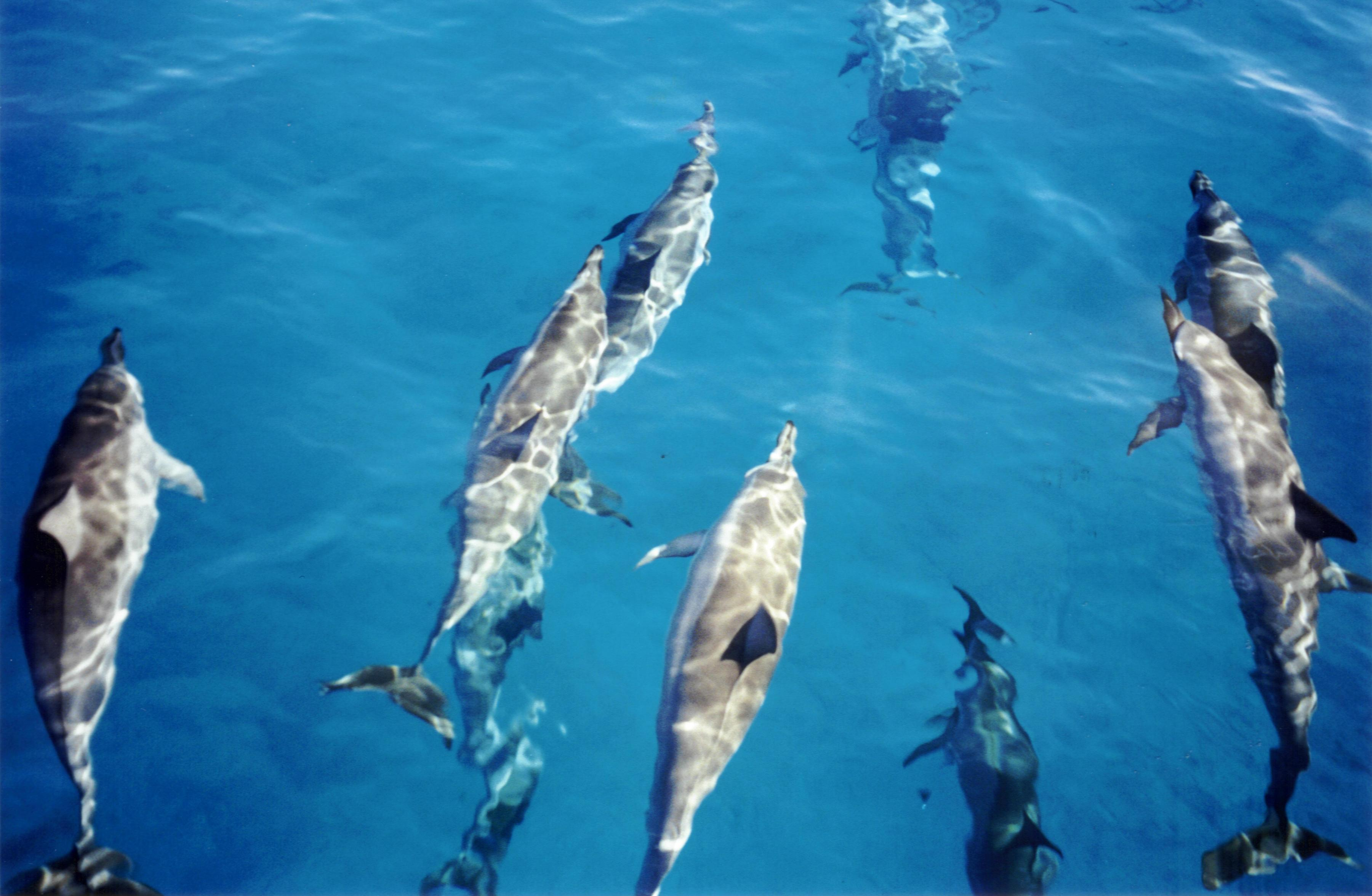
Spinner dolphins

The order Cetacea includes whales, dolphins and porpoises. They are the mammals most fully adapted to aquatic life with a spindle-shaped nearly hairless body, protected by a thick layer of blubber, and forelimbs and tail modified to provide propulsion underwater.

- Suborder: Mysticeti
  - Family: Balaenopteridae (baleen whales)
    - Genus: Balaenoptera
      - Common minke whale, Balaenoptera acutorostrata
      - Sei whale, Balaenoptera borealis
      - Bryde's whale, Balaenoptera brydei
      - Blue whale, Balaenoptera musculus
    - Genus: Megaptera
      - Humpback whale, Megaptera novaeangliae
- Suborder: Odontoceti
  - Superfamily: Platanistoidea
    - Family: Delphinidae (marine dolphins)
      - Genus: Delphinus
        - Short-beaked common dolphin, Delphinus delphis DD
      - Genus: Feresa
        - Pygmy killer whale, Feresa attenuata DD
      - Genus: Globicephala
        - Short-finned pilot whale, Globicephala macrorhyncus DD
      - Genus: Lagenodelphis
        - Fraser's dolphin, Lagenodelphis hosei DD
      - Genus: Grampus
        - Risso's dolphin, Grampus griseus DD
      - Genus: Orcinus
        - Killer whale, Orcinus orca DD
      - Genus: Peponocephala
        - Melon-headed whale, Peponocephala electra DD
      - Genus: Pseudorca
        - False killer whale, Pseudorca crassidens DD
      - Genus: Stenella
        - Pantropical spotted dolphin, Stenella attenuata DD
        - Clymene dolphin, Stenella clymene DD
        - Striped dolphin, Stenella coeruleoalba DD
        - Atlantic spotted dolphin, Stenella frontalis DD
        - Spinner dolphin, Stenella longirostris DD
      - Genus: Steno
        - Rough-toothed dolphin, Steno bredanensis DD
      - Genus: Tursiops
        - Common bottlenose dolphin, Tursiops truncatus
    - Family: Physeteridae (sperm whales)
      - Genus: Physeter
        - Sperm whale, Physeter catodon DD
    - Family: Kogiidae (dwarf sperm whales)
      - Genus: Kogia
        - Pygmy sperm whale, Kogia breviceps DD
        - Dwarf sperm whale, Kogia sima DD
  - Superfamily Ziphioidea
    - Family: Ziphidae (beaked whales)
      - Genus: Mesoplodon
        - Gervais' beaked whale, Mesoplodon europaeus DD
      - Genus: Ziphius
        - Cuvier's beaked whale, Ziphius cavirostris DD

== Order: Carnivora (carnivorans) ==
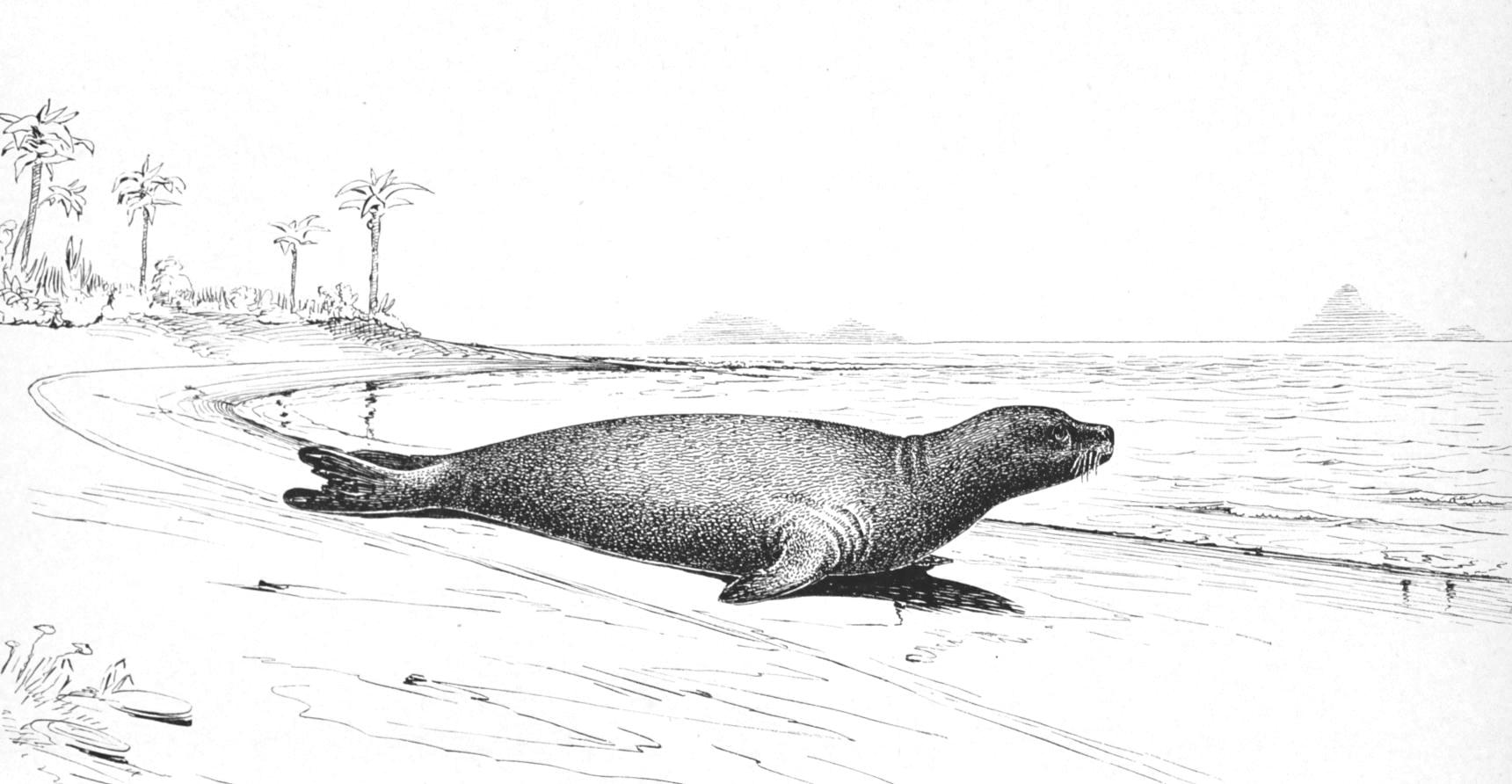
Caribbean monk seal

There are over 260 species of carnivorans, the majority of which feed primarily on meat. They have a characteristic skull shape and dentition.

- Suborder: Procyonidae
  - Family: Procyonidae
    - Genus: Procyon
      - Raccoon, P. lotor LC possibly introduced, extirpated
  - Family: Herpestidae
    - Genus: Urva
      - Small Indian mongoose, U. auropunctata LC introduced
- Suborder: Pinnipedia
  - Family: Phocidae (earless seals)
    - Genus: Neomonachus
      - Caribbean monk seal, N. tropicalis EX

== Order: Artiodactyla (even-toed ungulates) ==
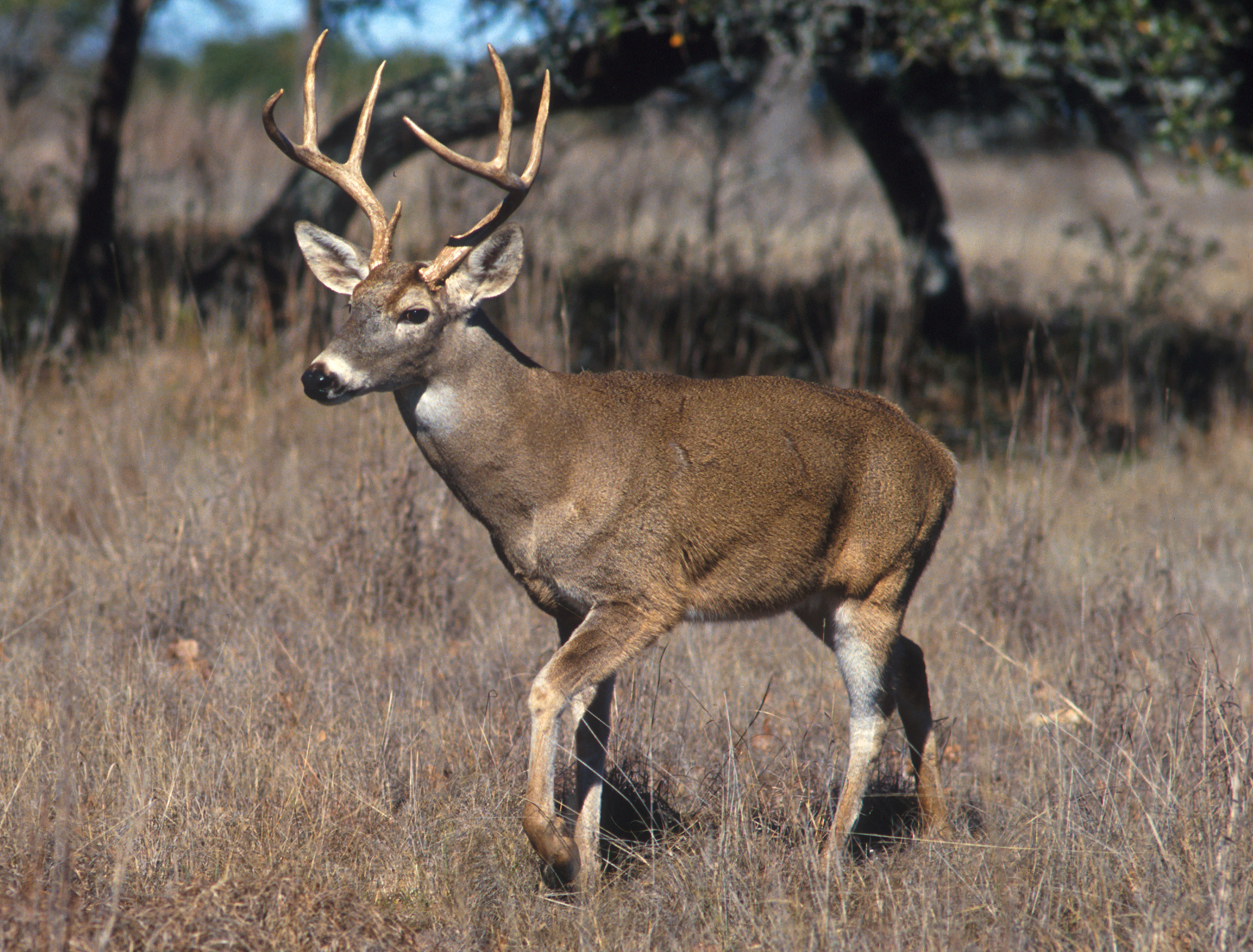
White-tailed deer

The even-toed ungulates are ungulates – hoofed animals – which bear weight equally on two (an even number) of their five toes: the third and fourth. The other three toes are either present, absent, vestigial, or pointing posteriorly.

- Family: Cervidae
  - Subfamily: Capreolinae
    - Genus: Odocoileus
      - White-tailed deer, Odocoileus virginianus LC introduced
- Family Suidae (pigs)
  - Genus: Sus
    - Wild boar, Sus scrofa LC introduced

== See also ==
- List of chordate orders
- Lists of mammals by region
- List of prehistoric mammals
- Mammal classification
- List of mammals described in the 2000s
