= Hispaniolan edible rat =

Conservation status
- Extinct (IUCN 3.1)

Scientific classification
- Kingdom: Animalia
- Phylum: Chordata
- Class: Mammalia
- Order: Rodentia
- Family: Echimyidae
- Genus: †Brotomys; Miller, 1916
- Species: †B. voratus

Binomial name
- †Brotomys voratus Miller, 1916

Extinct species of rodent

The Hispaniolan edible rat (Brotomys voratus) is a recently extinct species of rodent in the family Echimyidae. It is the only species in the genus Brotomys. It was endemic to the island of Hispaniola in the Caribbean, in what is today the Dominican Republic and Haiti. Its natural habitat was subtropical or tropical moist lowland forests.

== Description ==
Brotomys was described by American zoologist Gerrit Smith Miller Jr. in the early 20th century from remains found in archaeological middens of Hispaniola. Miller identified Brotomys with the "mohuy", an animal recorded by the 16th-century Spanish historiographer and colonial mayor of Santo Domingo, Gonzalo Fernández de Oviedo y Valdés, in his General and Natural History of the Indies (1535):

The mohuy is an animal somewhat smaller than the hutia: its color is paler and likewise gray. This was the food most valued and esteemed by the caciques and chiefs of this island; and the character of the animal was much like the hutia except that the hair was denser and coarser (or more stiff), and very pointed and standing erect or straight above. I have not seen this animal, but there are many who declared it to be as aforesaid; and in this island there are many persons who have seen it and eaten it, and who praise this meat as better than all the others we have spoken about.

The erect hair is typical of the Echyimidae, which are called "spiny rats" because of it. The mentioned "hutia" could be the likewise extinct genera Quemisia or Isolobodon, both of greater size than Brotomys.

Despite its highly sought meat, the species is thought to have been primarily driven to extinction by introduced Old World rats rather than human hunting. A mandible of Brotomys was carbon dated to 340 ± 60 years BP (1550-1670 AD), proving it survived the Spanish conquest of Hispaniola.
