= I. portoricensis =

I. portoricensis may refer to:

- Icterus portoricensis, a New World blackbird
- Isolobodon portoricensis, an extinct rodent
