= Plate-toothed giant hutia =

Plate-toothed giant hutia Temporal range: Late Pleistocene

Scientific classification
- Kingdom: Animalia
- Phylum: Chordata
- Class: Mammalia
- Order: Rodentia
- Family: †Heptaxodontidae
- Genus: †Elasmodontomys; Anthony, 1916
- Species: †E. obliquus

Binomial name
- †Elasmodontomys obliquus Anthony, 1916

Synonyms
- Heptaxodon obliquus

Species of mammal (fossil)

The plate-toothed giant hutia (Elasmodontomys obliquus) is an extinct species of rodent in the family Heptaxodontidae. It is the only species within the genus Elasmodontomys. It was found in Puerto Rico.

== Description ==
The rodent is thought to have weighed 13 kilograms (29 lb) and survived for at least 2000 years after humans colonised Puerto Rico.

== Taxonomy ==
Despite being described as a "giant hutia", it has recently been recovered as a member of the Chinchilloidea.
