= Osborn's key mouse =

Osborn's key mouse Temporal range: Pleistocene

Scientific classification
- Domain: Eukaryota
- Kingdom: Animalia
- Phylum: Chordata
- Class: Mammalia
- Order: Rodentia
- Family: †Heptaxodontidae
- Genus: †Clidomys; Anthony, 1920
- Species: †C. osborni

Binomial name
- †Clidomys osborni Anthony, 1920

Synonyms
- Clidomys cundalli (Anthony, 1920); Clidomys jamaicensis (Anthony, 1920); Clidomys major (Anthony, 1920); Clidomys parvus (Anthony, 1920)

Extinct species of rodent

Osborn's key mouse (Clidomys osborni), also known as the larger Jamaican giant hutia, is an extinct species of large rodent in the family Heptaxodontidae. It was endemic to the island of Jamaica and likely became extinct before the end of the Pleistocene. Osborn's key mouse has only been found in six caves: Wallingford Roadside Cave, Sheep Pen Cave, Molton Fissure, Worthy Park Cave 1, Luidas Vale Cave, and Slue's Cave.

== Taxonomy ==
Clidomys parvus was thought to be a smaller and separate species from C. osborni but later investigation has shown that they may belong to the same species. The distinction is thought to have originated from the examination of juvenile specimens of C. osborni. This was concluded by examination of the teeth. In conclusion, it is very likely that C. osborni is the only valid species of Clidomys.
