= Blunt-toothed giant hutia =

Blunt-toothed giant hutia Temporal range: Pleistocene

Scientific classification
- Kingdom: Animalia
- Phylum: Chordata
- Class: Mammalia
- Order: Rodentia
- Family: †Heptaxodontidae
- Genus: †Amblyrhiza; Cope, 1868
- Species: †A. inundata

Binomial name
- †Amblyrhiza inundata Cope, 1868

Extinct species of rodent

The blunt-toothed giant hutia (Amblyrhiza inundata) is an extinct species of giant hutia from Anguilla and Saint Martin that is estimated to have weighed between 50 and 200 kg (110 and 440 lb). It was discovered by Edward Drinker Cope in 1868 in a sample of phosphate sediments mined in an unknown cave (possibly Cavannagh Cave) in Anguilla and sent to Philadelphia to estimate the value of the sediments. It is the sole species of the genus Amblyrhiza in the fossil family Heptaxodontidae.

Some authors have suggested that its extinction may have resulted from overhunting by pre-Columbian humans. However, it is unknown whether this species was contemporaneous with human populations. Fossil specimens discovered at the end of the 20th century on Anguilla have been dated to the last interstadial period, while very recent discoveries made on Coco Islet (Saint-Barthélemy) are dated to 400,000 - 500,000 years; no bone has been recovered yet from a pre-Columbian archaeological site. Despite being described as a "giant hutia", it has recently been recovered as a member of the Chinchilloidea.

== Description ==
Paleontologist A. R. Biknevicius and his team have estimated body size for Amblyrhiza inundata based upon 5 femora and 9 humeri from adult Amblyrhiza remains. They concluded based upon these specimens that Amblyrhiza ranged from just under 50 kg in mass to over 200 kg in mass. These calculations were based on comparisons with extant caviomorphs of 16 different species. The blunt teeth of Amblyrhiza inundata suggest an herbivorous lifestyle, consistent with that of the other genera within Heptaxodontidae.

== Taxonomy ==
Known colloquially as the "blunt toothed hutia", this animal's scientific name reflects a similar narrative. "Amblyrhiza" roughly translates to "blunt root", and "inundata" has been speculated to be in reference to Cope's disbelief that such a large rodent could evolve in an isolated region such as the islands of the northern Lesser Antilles. It is now accepted that Cope thought that the animal was cosmopolitan in nature, moving freely from island to island due to the lowered sea levels of the interval, which enabled Amblyrhiza to develop such an impressive body size. Amblyrhiza is currently considered to be a close relative of Elasmodontomys obliquus, a smaller yet similar rodent found in the Quaternary deposits of Puerto Rico. Although it has yet to be decided exactly where Amblyrhiza fits in a phylogenetic context, it is thought that they belong to a paraphyletic group of giant caviomorphs known as Heptaxodontidae. More recent work finds Amblyrhiza and Elasmodontomys to be members of the Chinchilloidea, with Amblyrhiza being most closely related to Dinomys.

== Discovery ==
Paleontology work began in the northeastern area of the Caribbean in the mid nineteenth century, when phosphate mining boomed in the region and fossils were coincidentally found in associated strata. Later, in 1868, samples of fossils and their overlying sediments were sent from the islands to the Philadelphia Academy of Sciences to estimate the potential scientific value of said specimens. These fossils were then given to famed paleontologist Edward Drinker Cope, who was serving as the academy's secretary at that time. Cope is said to have taken particular interest in them and their notably large size.

The fossilized remains of this remarkably large rodent are found solely within Quaternary cave deposits, all of which are located on the islands of the northern Lesser Antilles, specifically Anguilla and St. Martin.
