= Puerto Rican long-nosed bat =

Scientific classification
- Kingdom: Animalia
- Phylum: Chordata
- Class: Mammalia
- Order: Chiroptera
- Family: Phyllostomidae
- Genus: Monophyllus
- Species: M. plethodon
- Subspecies: M. p. frater

Trinomial name
- Monophyllus plethodon frater Anthony, 1917

Species of mammal

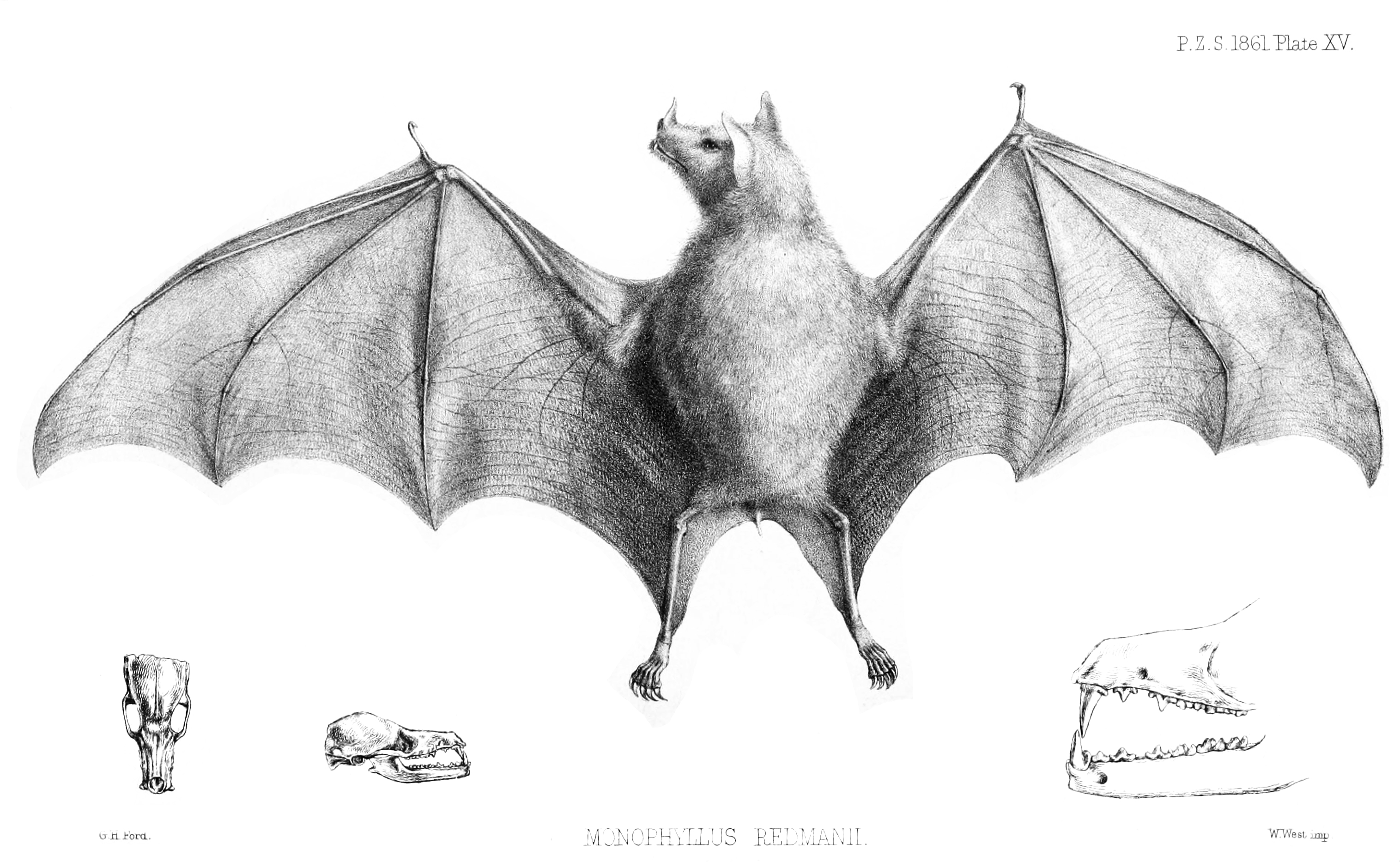
Monophyllus redmanii

The Puerto Rican long-nosed bat (Monophyllus plethodon frater) is known only from a skull fragment excavated in the large Cathedral Cave near Morovis, Puerto Rico, by Dr. H. E. Anthony prior to 1917. This species was never observed or documented live. Its extinction is attributed to hurricanes. A fossil fragment was cataloged in London.
