= Insular single leaf bat =

Conservation status
- Least Concern (IUCN 3.1)

Scientific classification
- Kingdom: Animalia
- Phylum: Chordata
- Class: Mammalia
- Order: Chiroptera
- Family: Phyllostomidae
- Genus: Monophyllus
- Species: M. plethodon

Binomial name
- Monophyllus plethodon Miller, 1900
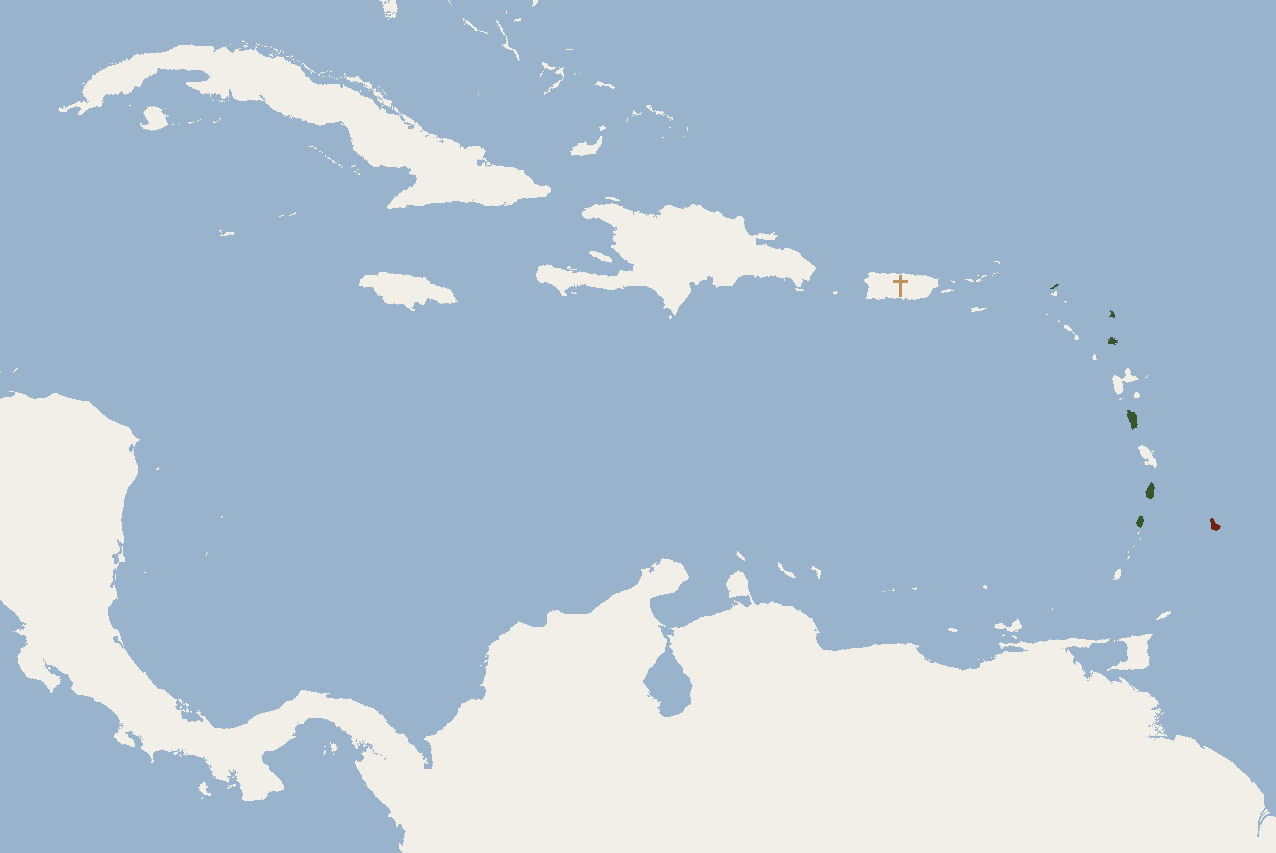

Species of bat

The insular single leaf bat or Lesser Antillean long-tongued bat (Monophyllus plethodon) is a species of leaf-nosed bat. It is found on the Lesser Antilles islands in the Caribbean Sea.

== Taxonomy ==
The insular single leaf bat was described as a new species in 1900 by Gerrit Smith Miller Jr. The holotype had been collected by P. McDonough in Saint Michael, Barbados.

Three subspecies are recognized: M. p. plethodon, M. p. luciae, and M. p. prater, with the Puerto Rican long-nosed bat (M. p. prater) extinct.

== Description ==
It is a large member of the genus Monophyllus. It can be distinguished from similar species by its crowded upper premolars. The forearm is 38.8–45.7 mm (1.53–1.80 in) long; the total body length is 67–84 mm (2.6–3.3 in); and the tail is 8–16 mm (0.31–0.63 in) long. It weighs about 12.5–17.2 g (0.44–0.61 oz). The dental formula is 2.1.2.32.1.3.3 for a total of 34 teeth.

== Range and habitat ==
The insular single leaf bat is distributed widely throughout the Lesser Antilles, occurring in Anguilla; Antigua and Barbuda; Barbados; Bermuda; the Caribbean Netherlands; Dominica; Guadeloupe; Martinique; Montserrat; Saint Barthélemy; Saint Kitts and Nevis; Saint Lucia; Saint Martin, and Saint Vincent and the Grenadines. It utilizes a variety of habitats including forests and agricultural landscapes at elevation os 0–550 m (0–1,804 ft) above sea level.
