= Xenotrichini =

Xenotrichini Temporal range: Miocene-Holocene

Scientific classification
- Kingdom: Animalia
- Phylum: Chordata
- Class: Mammalia
- Order: Primates
- Family: Pitheciidae
- Subfamily: Pitheciinae
- Tribe: †Xenotrichini; MacPhee & Horovitz, 2004

Genera
- †Xenothrix †Antillothrix †Insulacebus

Extinct tribe of monkeys

Xenotrichini (the Antilles monkeys) is a tribe of extinct primates, which lived on the Greater Antilles as recently as the last few thousand years.

These Caribbean islands no longer contain endemic primates; Xenothrix mcgregori, the species currently documented to have survived the latest, is estimated to have gone extinct around 900 years before present. The relationship of these species is supported by details in the formation of the skull and the lower jaw, such as a reduction in the number of teeth.

== Taxonomy ==
The exact timing and causes of extinction are not well-known and their relationship and placement in the parvorder of the New World monkeys is unsure. Originally they were thought to be closely related to the night monkeys, but more recent research has instead allied them with the titi monkeys.

A 2018 DNA study of the Jamaican monkey suggested that it diverged from its closest relative Cheracebus around 11 Ma, during the Late Miocene, which is younger than the 18 Ma Paralouatta from Cuba, meaning that the Jamaican monkey has a separate origin from the rest of the Antillean monkeys, making the group polyphyletic. The Cuban monkeys (Paralouatta varonai and P. marianae) of Cuba were originally thought to be in the tribe, but more recent research shows a closer relationship with Alouatta, the howler monkeys.

== Species ==
So far, three species of Xenotrichini are known:

- The Jamaican monkey (Xenothrix mcgregori), from Jamaica.
- The Hispaniola monkey (Antillothrix bernensis), from Hispaniola.
- Insulacebus toussaintiana, also from Hispaniola.
