= Insulacebus =

Insulacebus Temporal range: Holocene

Scientific classification
- Kingdom: Animalia
- Phylum: Chordata
- Class: Mammalia
- Order: Primates
- Suborder: Haplorhini
- Family: Aotidae
- Genus: †Insulacebus; Cooke et al. 2011
- Species: †I. toussaintiana

Binomial name
- †Insulacebus toussaintiana Cooke et al. 2011

Extinct genus of monkeys endemic to Hispaniola

Insulacebus is an extinct monotypic genus of New World monkey found on the island of Hispaniola from Late Quaternary deposits. Fossils of the type species Insulacebus toussaintiana have been recovered from the Plain of Formon, Department du Sud, southwestern Haiti. The body mass of the monkey was estimated between 4,159 and 5,443 grams (9.169 and 12.000 lb). The dentally primitive I. toussaintiana was likely derived from a fauna that was evolving on the mainland before the Miocene monkey bed of the Honda Group of central Colombia, and stems from a pre-Middle Miocene colonization from the South American mainland.

Location of discovery in Haiti

== See also ==
- Fossil primates of Central and South America and the Caribbean
- Hispaniola monkey of the Dominican Republic
- Jamaican monkey of Jamaica
- Paralouatta of Cuba
