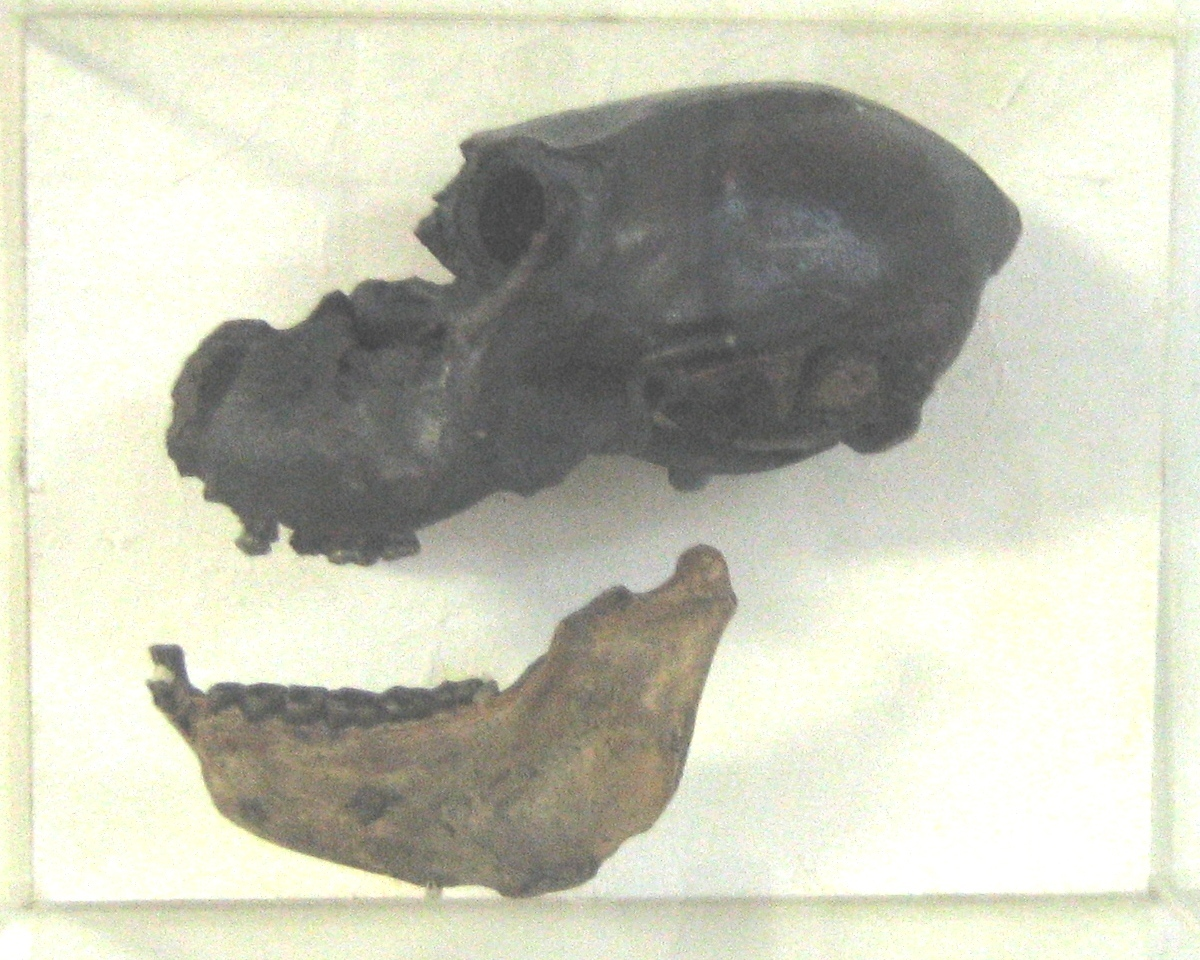
- Paralouatta marianae skull

Scientific classification
- Kingdom: Animalia
- Phylum: Chordata
- Class: Mammalia
- Order: Primates
- Suborder: Haplorhini
- Family: Atelidae
- Subfamily: Alouattinae
- Genus: †Paralouatta; Rivero & Arredondo 1991

Type species
- †Paralouatta varonai Rivero & Arredondo 1991

Species
- †P. marianae MacPhee et al. 2003; †P. varonai Rivero & Arredondo 1991

= Paralouatta =

Paralouatta Temporal range: Early Miocene-Quaternary

Extinct genus of new world monkeys

Paralouatta is a platyrrhine genus that currently contains two extinct species of small primates that lived on the island of Cuba.

== Description ==
Paralouatta varonai was described from a nearly complete cranium from the late Quaternary in 1991. This cranium and a number of isolated teeth and postcranial bones were found in the Cueva del Mono, a cave site in Pinar del Río Province. The initial description of the cranium included a proposal that Paralouatta varonai was a close Caribbean relative of the extant Alouatta (howler monkeys) of Central and South America, but this taxonomic placement was called into question with the analysis of the dental remains. Based on shared similarities with the three other Caribbean monkeys, Xenothrix mcgregori, Insulacebus toussaintiana, and Antillothrix bernensis, MacPhee and Horovitz have proposed that the Caribbean primates are part of a monophyletic radiation which entered the Caribbean at the Oligocene–Miocene boundary. Further research confirms this assessment and places these three species in the tribe Xenotrichini. However, more recent research restores its close relationship with Alouatta. The postcranial morphology of Paralouatta suggests that it was partly terrestrial, and a likely example of island gigantism.

A second species of Paralouatta (P. marianae) has also been described from the Burdigalian (~18 million years old) Lagunitas Formation and is the largest Neotropic primate known of that epoch.

== Paleobiology ==
Paralouatta had an estimated body mass of 8.4 kg (19 lb). Analysis of postcranial morphology suggests that Paralouatta was at least somewhat semi-terrestrial, making it the most terrestrial platyrrhine genus known.
