= Heptaxodontidae =

Heptaxodontidae Temporal range: Miocene–Holocene
- Quemisia gravis

Scientific classification
- Kingdom: Animalia
- Phylum: Chordata
- Class: Mammalia
- Order: Rodentia
- Suborder: Hystricomorpha
- Infraorder: Hystricognathi
- Parvorder: Caviomorpha
- Superfamily: Chinchilloidea
- Family: †Heptaxodontidae; Anthony, 1917

Genera
- †Amblyrhiza †Clidomys †Elasmodontomys †Quemisia †Xaymaca

Family of mammals (fossil)

Heptaxodontidae, rarely called giant hutia, is an extinct family of large rodents known from fossil and subfossil material found in the West Indies. One species, Amblyrhiza inundata, is estimated to have weighed between 50 and 200 kg (110 and 440 lb), reaching the weight of an eastern gorilla. This is twice as large as the capybara, the largest rodent living today, but still much smaller than Josephoartigasia monesi, the largest rodent known. These animals were probably used as a food source by the pre-Columbian peoples of the Caribbean.

Heptaxodontidae contains no living species and the grouping seems to be paraphyletic and arbitrary, however. One of the smaller species, Quemisia gravis, may have survived as late as when the Spanish began to colonize the Caribbean.

Despite the vernacular name, heptaxodontids are not closely related to the extant hutias of the family Echimyidae. Heptaxodontids are thought to be more closely related to the chinchillas.

== Taxonomy ==
Heptaxodontidae is divided into two subfamilies and contains six species in five genera.

- Family Heptaxodontidae
  - Subfamily Heptaxodontinae
    - Genus Amblyrhiza
      - Amblyrhiza inundata from Anguilla and St. Martin
    - Genus Elasmodontomys
      - Elasmodontomys obliquus from Puerto Rico
    - Genus Quemisia
      - Quemisia gravis from Hispaniola
    - Genus Xaymaca
      - Xaymaca fulvopulvis from Jamaica
  - Subfamily Clidomyinae
    - Genus Clidomys
      - Clidomys osborni from Jamaica

== See also ==
- Island gigantism
