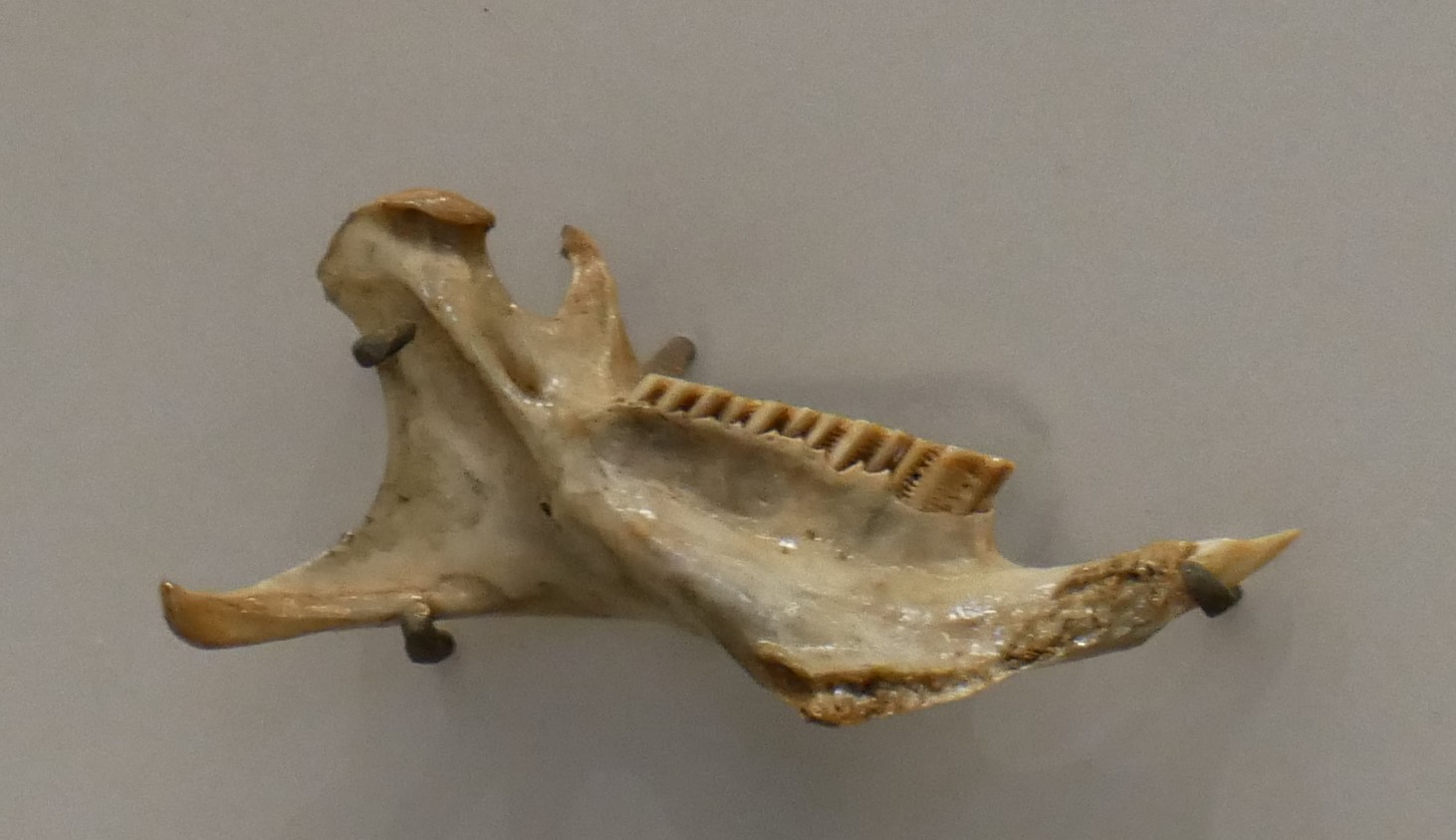
- Fossil mandible

Conservation status
- Extinct (~1525) (IUCN 3.1)

Scientific classification
- Kingdom: Animalia
- Phylum: Chordata
- Class: Mammalia
- Order: Rodentia
- Family: Echimyidae
- Genus: †Isolobodon
- Species: †I. portoricensis

Binomial name
- †Isolobodon portoricensis J. A. Allen, 1916

= Puerto Rican hutia =

Species of mammal

The Puerto Rican hutia (Isolobodon portoricensis) is an extinct species of rodent in the family Capromyidae. It was found on Hispaniola (today the Dominican Republic and Haiti) and Gonâve Island; it was introduced to the Virgin Islands and Puerto Rico.

== History ==
The Puerto Rican hutia was believed to be a vital food source for the Taíno for many years; despite this, they continued to survive until the arrival of early European explorers. Christopher Columbus and his crew are believed to have eaten the species upon their arrival. The species declined following European colonization of the West Indies. It is unclear whether it survived after facing threats from the early introduction of black rats (Rattus rattus) by the first European settlers around 1500, although it may have been finally wiped out by introduced small Indian mongooses (Urva auropunctata) in the 19th or early 20th century. Although commonly regarded as extinct, some researchers hold out hopes that the species still survives in undisturbed refuges.
