= Hispaniola monkey =

Hispaniola monkey Temporal range: Early Pleistocene-Holocene

Conservation status
- Extinct

Scientific classification
- Kingdom: Animalia
- Phylum: Chordata
- Class: Mammalia
- Infraclass: Placentalia
- Order: Primates
- Family: Pitheciidae
- Subfamily: Pitheciinae
- Tribe: †Xenotrichini
- Genus: †Antillothrix; MacPhee, Horovitz, Arredondo, & Jimenez Vasquez, 1995
- Species: †A. bernensis

Binomial name
- †Antillothrix bernensis Rímoli, 1977

Synonyms
- Saimiri bernensis

Extinct species of monkey

The Hispaniola monkey (Antillothrix bernensis) is an extinct primate that was endemic on the island of Hispaniola, in the present-day Dominican Republic. It became extinct sometime during the Holocene.

== Description ==
Horovitz and MacPhee developed the hypothesis, first proposed by MacPhee et al., that all the Antillean monkeys (the others being the two Cuban monkey species of genus Paralouatta, and the Jamaican monkey, Xenothrix mcgregori) belonged to a monophyletic group linked most closely with the modern genus Callicebus. They later assigned the Antillean monkeys to the tribe Xenotrichini – the sister group of the tribe Callicebini with extensive anatomical comparisons and by extending their parsimony analysis using PAUP*. They maintained that the monophyly of the Antillean monkeys was still supported in the most parsimonious trees, but in slightly less parsimonious trees, Aotus appeared to be linked with Xenothrix.

=== Skull discovery ===
In July 2009, Walter Pickel found a A. bernensis skull while diving in underwater caves. The skull was found in the La Jeringa Cave of Cotubanamá National Park. The skull, long bones and ribs were recovered by Walter Pickel and Curt Bowen in October 2009 under the supervision of the Dominican Republic and Alfred L. Rosenberger from Brooklyn College. The discovery supported the MacPhee et al. hypothesis of a monophyletic origin of the Antilles monkeys. This 2009 discovery of the skull suggested that these primates were diurnal, due to their relatively smaller ocular orbits.

=== New specimens published in 2024 ===
New specimens recovered in 2018 from Cueva Macho included four crania and three mandibles. Both a cranium and mandible exhibited absent wisdom teeth, which is rare in most primates. Though previously, hypotheses regarding smaller relative brain size than normal and sexual dimorphism had been posited, these new specimens evidence neither of these claims. Instead, the authors posit that Hispaniolan monkeys were "a morphologically variable but monomorphic species."

== Chronology ==
The oldest specimen of Antillothrix bernensis dates to around 1.32 million years ago, during the Early Pleistocene. The holotype specimen was dated to around 3850 ± 135 radiocarbon years Before Present.

== Ecology ==
Antillothrix is suggested to have been a generalised frugivore. It was likely a capable climber.

== See also ==
- Fossil primates of Central and South America and the Caribbean
