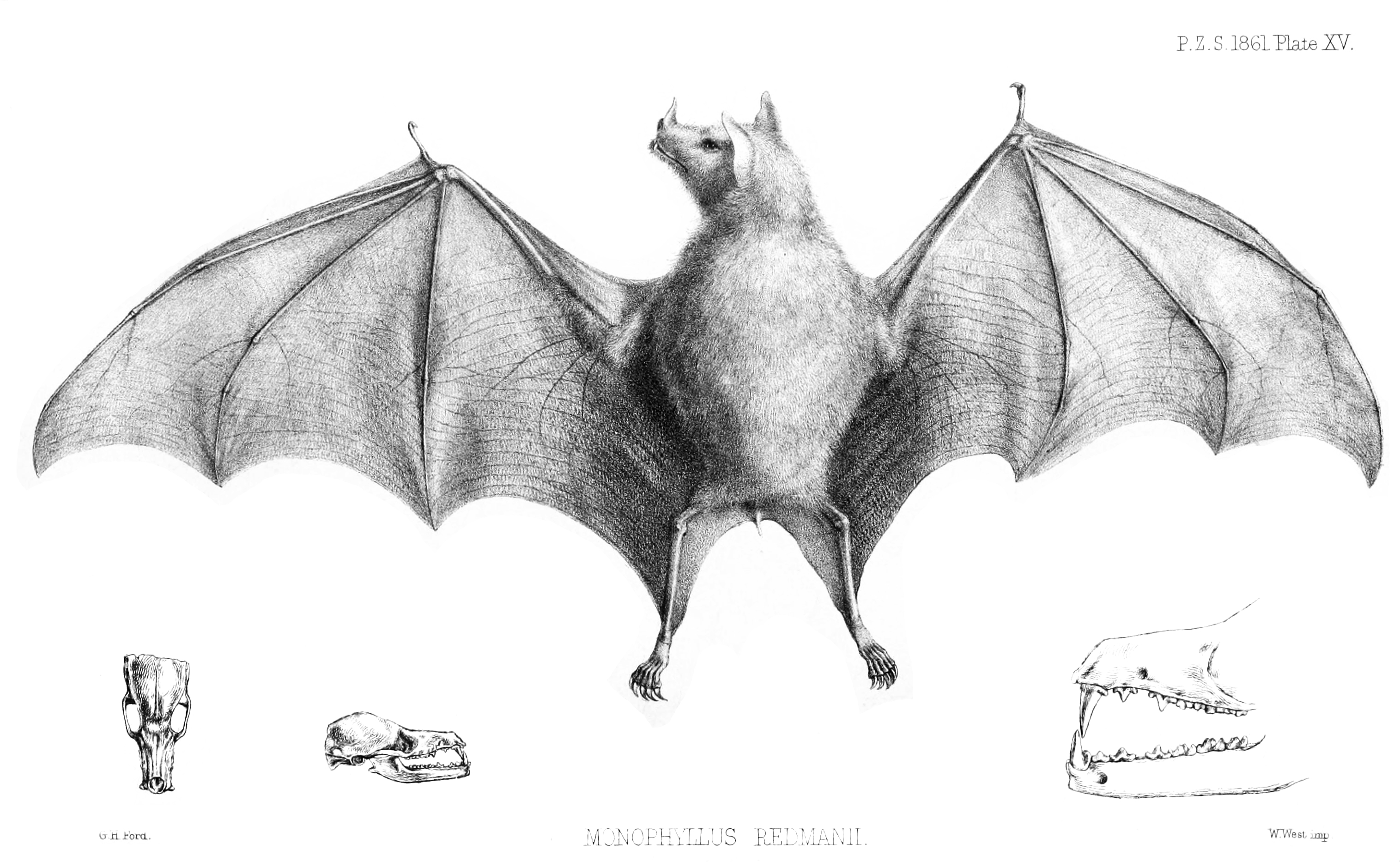
- Monophyllus redmani — Leach's single leaf bat, the type species

Scientific classification
- Domain: Eukaryota
- Kingdom: Animalia
- Phylum: Chordata
- Class: Mammalia
- Order: Chiroptera
- Family: Phyllostomidae
- Subfamily: Glossophaginae
- Genus: Monophyllus; Leach, 1821

Type species
- Monophyllus redmani Leach, 1821

= Monophyllus =

Genus of bats

Monophyllus, the Antillean long-tongued bats or single leaf bats, is a genus of bats in the family Phyllostomidae. They are distributed on the Antilles.

== Species ==
It contains the following species:

- Monophyllus plethodon Miller, 1900 — insular single leaf bat, Lesser Antillean long-tongued bat
  - †Monophyllus plethodon frater Anthony, 1917 — Puerto Rican long-nosed bat
  - Monophyllus plethodon luciae Miller, 1902
  - Monophyllus plethodon plethodon Miller, 1900
- Monophyllus redmani Leach, 1821 — Leach's single leaf bat, Greater Antillean long-tongued bat
  - Monophyllus redmani clinedaphus Miller, 1900
  - Monophyllus redmani portoricensis Miller, 1900
  - Monophyllus redmani redmani Leach, 1821
