= Jamaican monkey =

Jamaican monkey Temporal range: Pleistocene-Holocene

Conservation status
- Extinct (c.1050) (IUCN 3.1)

Scientific classification
- Kingdom: Animalia
- Phylum: Chordata
- Class: Mammalia
- Order: Primates
- Family: Pitheciidae
- Subfamily: Pitheciinae
- Tribe: †Xenotrichini
- Genus: †Xenothrix; Williams & Koopman, 1952
- Species: †X. mcgregori

Binomial name
- †Xenothrix mcgregori Williams & Koopman, 1952

Extinct species of monkey endemic to Jamaica

The Jamaican monkey (Xenothrix mcgregori) is an extinct species of New World monkey that was endemic to Jamaica. It was first uncovered at Long Mile Cave by Harold Anthony in 1920.

== Discovery ==
Harold Anthony is responsible for many species descriptions of Caribbean taxa during the 1920s and his field notes record the discovery of the monkey material:

"January 17 – Spent all day digging in the long mile cave and secured some good bones. The most important find was the lower jaw and femur of a small monkey, found in the yellow limestone detritus. It was not associated with the human remains but not so far from them that the animal must not be strongly suspected as an introduced species. It was deeper than any of the human bones by at least 10" to 1'…" (reproduced in Williams and Koopman, 1952)

The eventual species description was not completed until 1952 when two graduate students, Ernest Williams and Karl Koopman, found the associated femur and mandibular fragment forgotten in a drawer at the American Museum of Natural History. They remained wary in describing the primate taxonomically as it had shared characteristics with a number of platyrrhine taxa.

== Analysis ==
The small mandible has a dental formula of 2 incisors, 1 canine, 3 premolars and 2 molars – a departure from the vast majority of living platyrrhines (with the notable exception of the callitrichines). It is significantly larger than the living callitrichines, and work by Rosenberger has largely eliminated the possibility that these taxa share a close phylogenetic relationship. Rosenberger suggested that the absence of the third molar in Xenothrix was not homologous with the character state in callitrichines. He based his assessment on the length of the molars relative to the molar row, and the inferred retention of hypocones on M1-2, which have been greatly reduced in the marmosets and tamarins. He further suggested that Xenothrix shared a close phylogenetic affinity with the genera Callicebus or Aotus. His conclusions were tentative due to the fragmentary nature of the material.

The postcranial remains discovered by Anthony in the 1920s were eventually described by MacPhee and Fleagle who attributed the femur, os coxae, and tibia to the order Primates. MacPhee and Fleagle stated that the primate postcrania bore little resemblance to modern forms, but they interpreted the femur as being indicative of slow climbing. The femur also shares some similarities with Potos flavus, the kinkajou. They provisionally accepted Hershkovitz's family Xenotrichidae until further analysis could fully elucidate the relationships of Xenothrix.

== Further research ==
In the 1990s, several expeditions to Jamaican cave sites resulted in the recovery of additional cranial and postcranial material attributed to Xenothrix, including a partial lower face containing the palate with left and right P4-M2, most of the maxilla and parts of the sphenoid. This discovery confirmed that the dental formula of this taxon is 2.1.3.2. With the new partial face, Horovitz and MacPhee were able to further develop the hypothesis, first proposed by MacPhee et al., that all the Antillean monkeys (the others being the two Cuban monkey species of genus Paralouatta and Insulacebus toussaintiana and Antillothrix bernensis of Hispaniola) belonged to a monophyletic group linked most closely with modern Callicebus.

Rosenberger has objected to this hypothesis and has suggested that Xenothrix was a Jamaican owl monkey, thus modifying his earlier view. He based his conclusions on the fairly large orbit size as inferred from the preserved orbital rim, large inferior orbital fissure, and the large I1 alveolus as compared to the I2 alveolus. These characters are shared with Aotus. MacPhee and Horovitz tested this alternative phylogeny with extensive anatomical comparisons and by extending their parsimony analysis using PAUP*. They maintained that the monophyly of the Antillean monkeys was still supported in the most parsimonious trees, but in slightly less parsimonious trees, Aotus does appear to be linked with Xenothrix. MacPhee and Horovitz assigned the Antillean monkeys to the tribe Xenotrichini – the sister group of the tribe Callicebini.

DNA analysis indicates that the species is a type of titi monkey, sister to the recently recognized northern South American genus Cheracebus, that colonized Jamaica around 11 million years ago. This is younger than the oldest fossils of monkeys on Cuba, meaning that the Jamaican monkey has a separate origin from the other monkeys of the Greater Antilles.
