= Twisted-toothed mouse =

Twisted-toothed mouse Temporal range: Late Pleistocene - Early Holocene

Scientific classification
- Kingdom: Animalia
- Phylum: Chordata
- Class: Mammalia
- Order: Rodentia
- Family: †Heptaxodontidae
- Genus: †Quemisia; Miller, 1929
- Species: †Q. gravis

Binomial name
- †Quemisia gravis Miller, 1929

Species of mammal (fossil)

The twisted-toothed mouse (Quemisia gravis), also known as the twisted-toothed giant hutia, is an extinct species of rodent in the family Heptaxodontidae. It is monotypic within the genus Quemisia. It was endemic to Hispaniola (today Haiti and the Dominican Republic).
