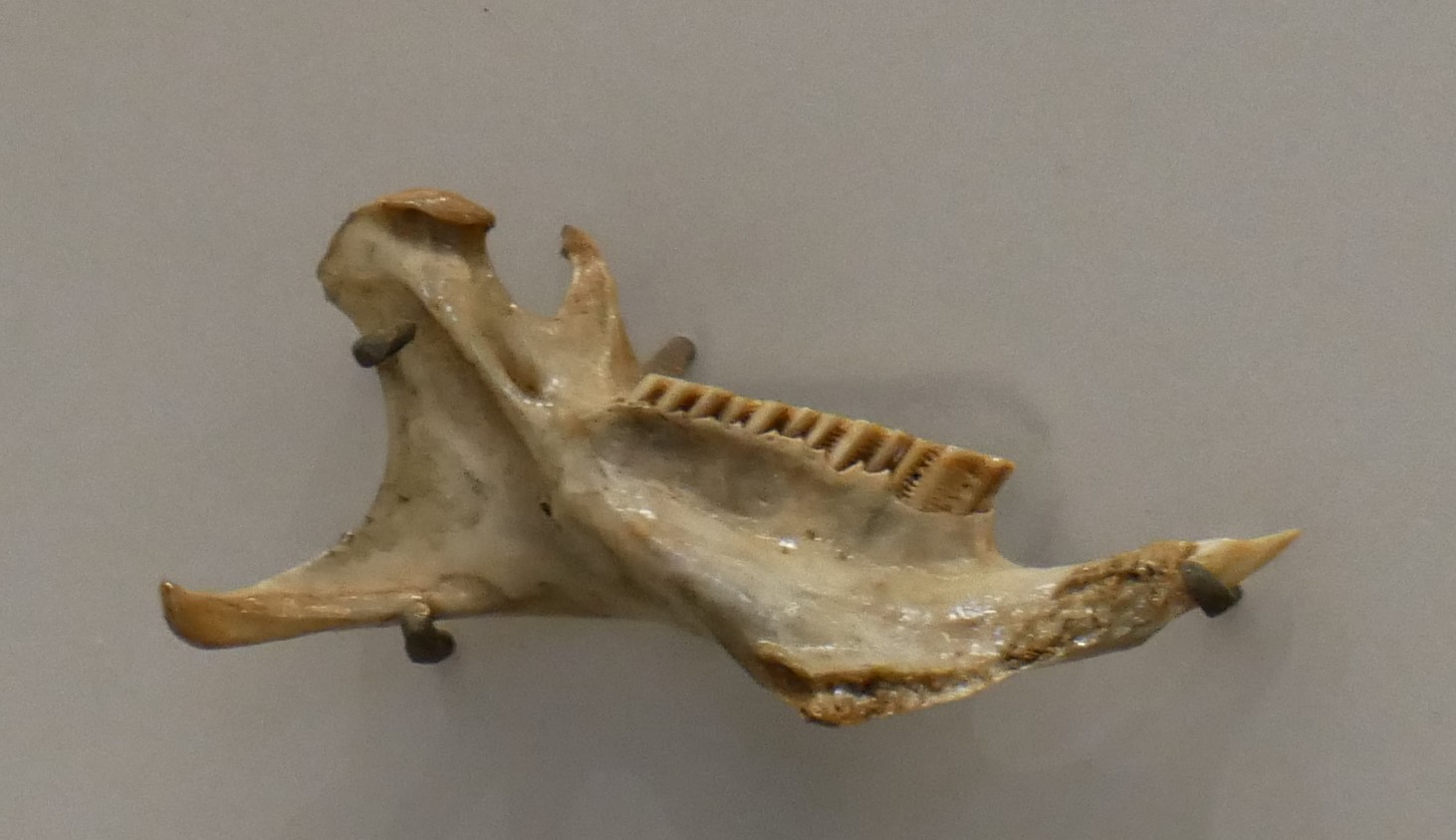
- Isolobodon portoricensis mandible

Scientific classification
- Kingdom: Animalia
- Phylum: Chordata
- Class: Mammalia
- Order: Rodentia
- Family: Echimyidae
- Subfamily: Capromyinae
- Tribe: †Isolobodontini; Woods, 1989
- Genus: †Isolobodon; J. A. Allen, 1916

Type species
- Isolobodon portoricensis J. A. Allen, 1916

Species
- Isolobodon montanus Isolobodon portoricensis

= Isolobodon =

Isolobodon Temporal range: Holocene

Extinct genus of rodents

Isolobodon is an extinct genus of rodent in the subfamily Capromyinae. It contains the following species:

- Montane hutia (Isolobodon montanus)
- Puerto Rican hutia (Isolobodon portoricensis)
