= List of bats of the Caribbean by island =

The bat fauna of the Caribbean region is diverse.

For the purposes of this article, the "Caribbean" includes all islands in the Caribbean Sea (except for small islets close to the mainland) and the Bahamas, Turks and Caicos Islands, and Barbados, which are not in the Caribbean Sea but biogeographically belong to the same Caribbean bioregion.

== Overview ==
The genera of Caribbean bats are classified as follows:

- Order Chiroptera
  - Family Emballonuridae
    - Subfamily Emballonurinae: Diclidurus, Peropteryx, Rhynchonycteris, Saccopteryx
  - Family Furipteridae: Furipterus
  - Family Molossidae
    - Subfamily Molossinae: Cynomops, Eumops, Molossus, Mormopterus, Nyctinomops, Promops, Tadarida
  - Family Mormoopidae: Mormoops, Pteronotus
  - Family Natalidae: Chilonatalus, Natalus, Nyctiellus
  - Family Noctilionidae: Noctilio
  - Family Phyllostomidae
    - Subfamily Brachyphyllinae: Brachyphylla
    - Subfamily Carolliinae: Carollia
    - Subfamily Desmodontinae: Desmodus, Diaemus
    - Subfamily Glossophaginae
      - Tribe Glossophagini: Anoura, Glossophaga, Monophyllus
    - Subfamily Phyllonycterinae: Erophylla, Phyllonycteris
    - Subfamily Phyllostominae: Glyphonycteris, Lampronycteris, Lonchorhina, Lophostoma, Macrotus, Micronycteris, Mimon, Phyllostomus, Tonatia, Trachops, Trinycteris, Vampyrum
    - Subfamily Stenodermatinae
      - Tribe Stenodermatini: Ametrida, Ardops, Ariteus, Artibeus, Centurio, Chiroderma, Cubanycteris, Mesophylla, Phyllops, Platyrrhinus, Stenoderma, Uroderma, Vampyrodes
      - Tribe Sturnirini: Sturnira
  - Family Thyropteridae: Thyroptera
  - Family Vespertilionidae
    - Subfamily Antrozoinae: Antrozous
    - Subfamily Myotinae: Myotis
    - Subfamily Vespertilioninae
      - Tribe Eptesicini: Eptesicus
      - Tribe Lasiurini: Lasiurus
      - Tribe Nycticeiini: Nycticeius, Rhogeessa

== Greater Antilles and associated islands ==
The four islands of the Greater Antilles, Cuba, Hispaniola, Jamaica, and Puerto Rico, and the surrounding smaller islands are home to a diverse indigenous bat fauna.

=== Cuba ===
Cuba, the largest of the Antilles, and its surrounding islands, of which the Isla de la Juventud is the most significant, harbor a diverse bat fauna.

- Antrozous pallidus
- †Artibeus anthonyi
- Artibeus jamaicensis
- Brachyphylla nana
- Chilonatalus micropus
- †Cubanycteris silvai
- †Desmodus rotundus (=puntajudensis syn.)
- Eptesicus fuscus
- Erophylla sezekorni
- Eumops ferox (formerly included in E. glaucinus)
- Eumops perotis
- Lasiurus insularis (formerly included in L. intermedius)
- Lasiurus pfeifferi (formerly included in L. borealis)
- Macrotus waterhousii
- Molossus molossus
- Monophyllus redmani
- Mormoops blainvillei
- †Mormoops magna
- Mormoops megalophylla (extirpated)
- Mormopterus minutus
- Natalus primus
- Noctilio leporinus
- Nycticeius cubanus (formerly included in N. humeralis)
- Nyctiellus lepidus
- Nyctinomops laticaudatus
- Nyctinomops macrotis
- Phyllonycteris poeyi
- Phyllops falcatus (also Coco, Paredón Grande, Sabana-Camagüey Archipelago)
- †Phyllops silvai
- †Phyllops vetus
- Pteronotus macleayii
- Pteronotus parnellii
- †Pteronotus pristinus
- Pteronotus quadridens
- Tadarida brasiliensis

=== Isla de la Juventud ===
Isla de la Juventud is a large island south of Cuba and politically part of it.

- Artibeus jamaicensis
- Brachyphylla nana
- Chilonatalus micropus
- Eptesicus fuscus
- Erophylla sezekorni
- Lasiurus insularis
- Macrotus waterhousii
- Molossus molossus
- Monophyllus redmani
- Natalus primus (extirpated)
- Noctilio leporinus
- Nyctiellus lepidus
- Phyllonycteris poeyi
- Phyllops falcatus (extirpated)
- †Phyllops vetus
- Pteronotus macleayii
- Tadarida brasiliensis

=== Grand Cayman ===
Grand Cayman is the largest of the Cayman Islands, a group of British islands west of Jamaica and south of Cuba.

- Artibeus jamaicensis
- Brachyphylla nana
- Chilonatalus micropus (extirpated)
- Eptesicus fuscus
- Erophylla sezekorni
- Macrotus waterhousii
- Molossus molossus
- Monophyllus redmani (extirpated)
- Natalus cf. major (extirpated)
- Phyllops falcatus
- Pteronotus parnellii (extirpated)
- Tadarida brasiliensis

=== Little Cayman ===
Little Cayman, also part of the Cayman Islands, is located east of Grand Cayman and just west of Cayman Brac.

- Artibeus jamaicensis
- Macrotus waterhousii

=== Cayman Brac ===
Cayman Brac is the easternmost of the Cayman Islands.

- Artibeus jamaicensis
- Brachyphylla nana (extirpated)
- Eptesicus fuscus
- Erophylla sezekorni
- Macrotus waterhousii
- Molossus molossus
- Phyllonycteris poeyi (extirpated)
- Phyllops falcatus

=== Jamaica ===
- Ariteus flavescens
- Artibeus jamaicensis
- Brachyphylla nana (extirpated)
- Chilonatalus micropus
- Eptesicus lynni (often included in E. fuscus)
- Erophylla sezekorni
- Eumops auripendulus
- Eumops ferox (formerly included in E. glaucinus)
- Glossophaga soricina
- Lasiurus degelidus (formerly included in L. borealis)
- Macrotus waterhousii
- Molossus molossus
- Monophyllus redmani
- Mormoops blainvillei
- Mormoops megalophylla (extirpated)
- Natalus jamaicensis
- Noctilio leporinus
- Nyctinomops macrotis
- Phyllonycteris aphylla
- Pteronotus macleayii
- Pteronotus parnellii
- Pteronotus quadridens
- Tadarida brasiliensis
- Tonatia saurophila (extirpated)

=== Navassa Island ===
Navassa Island is a small U.S. island between Jamaica and Hispaniola.

- Macrotus waterhousii

=== Hispaniola ===
Hispaniola, the second largest of the Antilles, is politically divided into Haiti and the Dominican Republic. Various bats are known from both the main island and several surrounding islands, including Gonâve Island.

- Artibeus jamaicensis
- Brachyphylla nana
- Chilonatalus micropus
- Eptesicus fuscus
- Erophylla bombifrons
- Lasiurus minor (formerly included in L. borealis)
- Macrotus waterhousii (also Beata Island)
- Molossus molossus
- Monophyllus redmani
- Mormoops blainvillei
- Mormoops megalophylla (extirpated)
- Natalus major
- Noctilio leporinus
- Nyctinomops macrotis
- Phyllonycteris poeyi
- Phyllops falcatus
- Pteronotus parnellii
- Pteronotus quadridens
- Tadarida brasiliensis

=== Gonâve ===
Gonâve Island is an island off western Haiti.

- Artibeus jamaicensis
- Macrotus waterhousii (extirpated)
- Molossus molossus
- Monophyllus redmani (extirpated)
- Mormoops blainvillei (extirpated)
- Pteronotus parnellii (extirpated)

=== Puerto Rico ===
Several bats are known from Puerto Rico, the easternmost of the Greater Antilles, which is under United States sovereignty.

- Artibeus jamaicensis (incl. Mona and Caja de Muertos)
- Brachyphylla cavernarum
- Eptesicus fuscus
- Erophylla bombifrons
- Lasiurus minor
- Macrotus waterhousii (extirpated)
- Molossus molossus (also Culebra)
- Monophyllus plethodon (extirpated)
- Monophyllus redmani
- Mormoops blainvillei
- Noctilio leporinus
- †Phyllonycteris major
- Pteronotus parnellii
- Pteronotus quadridens
- Stenoderma rufum
- Tadarida brasiliensis

== Leeward Islands ==
The Leeward Islands form the northern segment of the Lesser Antilles.

=== U.S. Virgin Islands ===
The United States Virgin Islands are a group of islands east of Puerto Rico, centered around the three main islands of Saint Thomas, Saint John and Saint Croix.

==== St. Croix ====
- Brachyphylla cavernarum
- Molossus molossus
- Noctilio leporinus
- Stenoderma rufum

==== St. Thomas ====
- Brachyphylla cavernarum
- Molossus molossus
- Noctilio leporinus
- Stenoderma rufum

==== St. John ====
- Brachyphylla cavernarum
- Molossus molossus
- Stenoderma rufum
- Tadarida brasiliensis
- Noctilio leporinus

=== British Virgin Islands ===
- Artibeus jamaicensis
- Brachyphylla cavernarum (Norman Island)
- Molossus molossus (Tortola, Virgin Gorda)
- Noctilio leporinus
- Tadarida brasiliensis

=== Anguilla ===
Anguilla is a British island.

- Artibeus jamaicensis
- Brachyphylla cavernarum
- Macrotus waterhousii (extirpated)
- Molossus molossus
- Monophyllus plethodon
- Mormoops blainvillei (extirpated)
- Natalus stramineus
- Noctilio leporinus

=== Saint Martin ===
The island of Saint Martin is divided into a French and a Dutch part.

- Ardops nichollsi
- Artibeus jamaicensis
- Brachyphylla cavernarum
- Molossus molossus
- Monophyllus plethodon
- Myotis nesopolus (probably accidental)
- Natalus stramineus (possibly extirpated)
- Noctilio leporinus
- Tadarida brasiliensis

=== Saint Barthelemy ===
- Artibeus jamaicensis
- Brachyphylla cavernarum
- Molossus molossus
- Monophyllus plethodon
- Tadarida brasiliensis

=== Saba ===
- Ardops nichollsi
- Artibeus jamaicensis
- Brachyphylla cavernarum
- Molossus molossus
- Monophyllus plethodon
- Natalus stramineus
- Tadarida brasiliensis

=== Sint Eustatius ===
Sint Eustatius is a small island near Saint Kitts that is part of the Netherlands.

- Ardops nichollsi
- Artibeus jamaicensis
- Brachyphylla cavernarum
- Molossus molossus
- Tadarida brasiliensis

=== Saint Kitts ===
Saint Kitts forms the nation of Saint Kitts and Nevis together with nearby Nevis.

- Ardops nichollsi
- Artibeus jamaicensis
- Artibeus schwartzi
- Brachyphylla cavernarum
- Molossus molossus
- Monophyllus plethodon
- Noctilio leporinus
- Tadarida brasiliensis

=== Nevis ===
Nevis is the second main island of Saint Kitts and Nevis.

- Ardops nichollsi
- Artibeus jamaicensis
- Artibeus schwartzi
- Brachyphylla cavernarum
- Molossus molossus
- Monophyllus plethodon
- Natalus stramineus
- Noctilio leporinus
- Tadarida brasiliensis

=== Antigua ===
Antigua forms Antigua and Barbuda together with Barbuda.

- Artibeus jamaicensis
- Brachyphylla cavernarum
- Molossus molossus
- Monophyllus plethodon
- Mormoops blainvillei (extirpated)
- Natalus stramineus
- Noctilio leporinus
- Phyllonycteris major (extinct)
- Pteronotus parnellii (extirpated)
- Tadarida brasiliensis

=== Barbuda ===
Barbuda is the other main island of Antigua and Barbuda.

- Artibeus jamaicensis
- Brachyphylla cavernarum
- Macrotus waterhousii
- Molossus molossus
- Monophyllus plethodon
- Mormoops blainvillei (extirpated)
- Natalus stramineus
- Noctilio leporinus
- Tadarida brasiliensis

=== Montserrat ===
Montserrat is a small British island.

- Ardops nichollsi
- Artibeus jamaicensis
- Artibeus schwartzi
- Brachyphylla cavernarum
- Chiroderma improvisum
- Molossus molossus
- Monophyllus plethodon
- Myotis nigricans (unconfirmed record)
- Natalus stramineus
- Noctilio leporinus
- Sturnira thomasi
- Tadarida brasiliensis

=== Guadeloupe ===
The double island of Guadeloupe, which consists of two parts separated only by a narrow channel, is the core of the French overseas department of Guadeloupe.

- Ardops nichollsi
- Artibeus jamaicensis
- Brachyphylla cavernarum
- Chiroderma improvisum
- Eptesicus guadeloupensis
- Molossus molossus
- Monophyllus plethodon
- Myotis dominicensis
- Natalus stramineus
- Noctilio leporinus
- Sturnira thomasi
- Tadarida brasiliensis

=== La Désirade ===
La Désirade is a small island east of Guadeloupe.

- Artibeus jamaicensis
- Brachyphylla cavernarum
- Molossus molossus
- Tadarida brasiliensis

=== Marie Galante ===
Marie Galante is a smaller island that politically belongs to nearby Guadeloupe.

- Artibeus jamaicensis
- Brachyphylla cavernarum
- Molossus molossus
- Natalus stramineus
- Pteronotus davyi

=== Dominica ===
Dominica, the southernmost of the Leeward Islands, is an independent state.

- Ardops nichollsi
- Artibeus jamaicensis
- Brachyphylla cavernarum
- Eptesicus fuscus
- Molossus molossus
- Monophyllus plethodon
- Myotis dominicensis
- Natalus stramineus
- Noctilio leporinus
- Pteronotus davyi
- Sturnira lilium
- Tadarida brasiliensis

== Windward Islands ==
The bat fauna of the Windward Islands is more diverse than that of the Leeward Islands, reflecting the islands' location closer to the South American mainland.

=== Martinique ===
Martinique is a French overseas department.

- Ardops nichollsi
- Artibeus jamaicensis
- Brachyphylla cavernarum
- Molossus molossus
- Monophyllus plethodon
- Myotis martiniquensis
- Natalus stramineus
- Noctilio leporinus
- Pteronotus davyi
- Sturnira lilium
- Tadarida brasiliensis

=== Saint Lucia ===
The island of Saint Lucia is an independent state.

- Ardops nichollsi
- Artibeus jamaicensis
- Artibeus lituratus
- Artibeus schwartzi
- Brachyphylla cavernarum
- Molossus molossus
- Monophyllus plethodon
- Noctilio leporinus
- Sturnira lilium
- Tadarida brasiliensis

=== Saint Vincent ===
Saint Vincent and the Grenadines is an independent state, composed of the main island of Saint Vincent and the northern portion of the Grenadines.

- Ardops nichollsi (?)
- Artibeus jamaicensis
- Artibeus lituratus (?)
- Artibeus planirostris
- Artibeus schwartzi
- Brachyphylla cavernarum
- Glossophaga longirostris
- Micronycteris megalotis (?)
- Molossus molossus
- Monophyllus plethodon (?)
- Noctilio leporinus
- Pteronotus parnellii
- Sturnira lilium
- Tadarida brasiliensis

=== Grenadines ===
- Artibeus jamaicensis (Carriacou)
- Artibeus planirostris (Carriacou)
- Artibeus schwartzi (Carriacou)
- Glossophaga longirostris (Union Mustique, Carriacou, Baquia)
- Molossus molossus
- Noctilio leporinus

=== Grenada ===
The island of Grenada, the southernmost of the main island chain of the Lesser Antilles, is part of an independent state that also comprises the southern Grenadines, including Carriacou.

- Anoura geoffroyi
- Artibeus glaucus
- Artibeus jamaicensis
- Artibeus lituratus
- Artibeus planirostris
- Artibeus schwartzi
- Carollia perspicillata (probably in error)
- Glossophaga longirostris
- Glossophaga soricina
- Micronycteris megalotis
- Molossus molossus
- Myotis nyctor
- Noctilio leporinus
- Peropteryx trinitatis
- Pteronotus davyi
- Sturnira lilium

=== Barbados ===
Barbados lies east of the main island chain of the Lesser Antilles.

- Artibeus jamaicensis
- Artibeus lituratus
- Artibeus schwartzi
- Brachyphylla cavernarum
- Eptesicus fuscus
- Molossus molossus
- Monophyllus plethodon
- Myotis nyctor
- Noctilio leporinus
- Tadarida brasiliensis

=== Trinidad ===
Trinidad, the larger island of Trinidad and Tobago, is close to mainland Venezuela and as a result has a very diverse bat fauna, including over 60 species, more than on any other Caribbean island, including much larger islands such as Cuba and Hispaniola.

- Ametrida centurio
- Anoura geoffroyi
- Artibeus glaucus
- Artibeus lituratus
- Artibeus planirostris
- Artibeus schwartzi
- Carollia brevicauda
- Carollia perspicillata
- Centurio senex
- Chiroderma trinitatum
- Chiroderma villosum
- Choeroniscus minor
- Cynomops greenhalli
- Desmodus rotundus
- Diaemus youngi
- Diclidurus albus
- Enchisthenes hartii
- Eptesicus brasiliensis
- Eumops auripendulus
- Furipterus horrens
- Glossophaga longirostris
- Glossophaga soricina
- Glyphonycteris daviesi
- Glyphonycteris sylvestris
- Lampronycteris brachyotis
- Lasiurus blossevillii
- Lasiurus ega
- Lonchorhina aurita
- Lophostoma brasiliense
- Mesophylla macconnelli
- Micronycteris hirsuta
- Micronycteris megalotis
- Micronycteris minuta
- Mimon crenulatum
- Molossus molossus
- Molossus rufus
- Molossus sinaloae
- Mormoops megalophylla
- Myotis keaysi
- Myotis nigricans
- Myotis pilosatibialis
- Myotis riparius
- Natalus tumidirostris
- Noctilio leporinus
- Nyctinomops laticaudatus
- Peropteryx trinitatis
- Phyllostomus discolor
- Phyllostomus hastatus
- Platyrrhinus helleri
- Promops centralis
- Promops nasutus
- Pteronotus davyi
- Pteronotus parnellii
- Pteronotus personatus
- Rhogeessa io
- Rhynchonycteris naso
- Saccopteryx bilineata
- Saccopteryx leptura
- Sturnira lilium
- Sturnira tildae
- Thyroptera tricolor
- Tonatia saurophila
- Trachops cirrhosus
- Trinycteris nicefori
- Uroderma bilobatum
- Vampyrodes caraccioli
- Vampyrum spectrum

=== Tobago ===
Tobago is the smaller of the main islands of Trinidad and Tobago, located to the northeast of Trinidad.

- Artibeus glaucus
- Artibeus lituratus
- Artibeus planirostris
- Carollia perspicillata
- Centurio senex
- Chiroderma villosum
- Eptesicus brasiliensis
- Glossophaga longirostris
- Micronycteris megalotis
- Molossus molossus
- Myotis attenboroughi
- Natalus tumidirostris
- Noctilio leporinus
- Peropteryx trinitatis
- Phyllostomus hastatus
- Rhogeessa io
- Saccopteryx bilineata
- Saccopteryx leptura
- Sturnira lilium
- Tadarida brasiliensis
- Vampyrodes caraccioli

== ABC islands ==
The ABC islands are three islands off northwestern Venezuela that are part of the Kingdom of the Netherlands.

=== Bonaire ===
Bonaire is the easternmost of the ABC islands.

- Ametrida centurio
- Glossophaga longirostris
- Leptonycteris curasoae
- Molossus molossus
- Mormoops megalophylla
- Myotis nesopolus
- Natalus tumidirostris

=== Curaçao ===
Curaçao is the largest of the ABC islands.

- Artibeus jamaicensis (possibly vagrant or extirpated)
- Glossophaga longirostris
- Leptonycteris curasoae
- Molossus molossus (possibly extirpated)
- Mormoops megalophylla
- Myotis nesopolus
- Natalus tumidirostris
- Noctilio leporinus
- Pteronotus davyi

=== Aruba ===
Aruba is the smallest of the ABC islands and the closest to the mainland.

- Artibeus jamaicensis
- Glossophaga longirostris
- Leptonycteris curasoae
- Molossus molossus
- Mormoops megalophylla
- Myotis nesopolus (maybe)
- Natalus tumidirostris
- Noctilio leporinus
- Peropteryx trinitatis
- Pteronotus davyi
- Sturnira lilium
- Tadarida brasiliensis

== Miscellaneous ==
=== Florida Keys ===
The Florida Keys are a group of islands near the Florida mainland.

- Artibeus jamaicensis
- Molossus molossus
- Phyllonycteris poeyi (unconfirmed sight record)
- Phyllops falcatus (Key West, possibly vagrant)
- Tadarida brasiliensis (unconfirmed record)

=== Bahamas ===
The Bahamas are a large archipelago north of Cuba and east of Florida.

- Artibeus jamaicensis (Mayaguana, Great Inagua)
- Brachyphylla nana (extirpated; Andros, New Providence)
- Chilonatalus tumidifrons (Andros; extirpated on Abaco, Exuma, New Providence)
- Eptesicus fuscus (Abaco, New Providence, Andros, Great Exuma, Little Exuma, Crooked Island, Acklin's Island, Long Island, San Salvador)
- Erophylla sezekorni (Great Abaco, Eleuthera, Long Island, Cat Island, Great Exuma, Little Exuma, San Salvador, Crooked Island, Acklin's Island, Great Inagua, Andros, Mayaguana, New Providence)
- Lasiurus minor (Andros)
- Lonchorhina aurita (New Providence, dubious)
- Macrotus waterhousii (Abaco, Andros, New Providence, Great Exuma, Great Inagua, Cat Island, Long Island)
- Monophyllus redmani (Abaco, Andros, New Providence; extirpated)
- Mormoops blainvillei (Abaco, Exuma, New Providence; extirpated)
- Mormoops megalophylla (Abaco, Andros; extirpated)
- Myotis cf. austroriparius (Abaco; extirpated)
- Natalus primus (Abaco, Andros, New Providence; extirpated)
- Noctilio leporinus (Great Inagua)
- Nyctiellus lepidus (Long Island, Cat Island, Little Exuma, Eleuthera; extirpated on Andros)
- Phyllonycteris poeyi (Abaco, New Providence; extirpated)
- Pteronotus macleayii (New Providence, extirpated)
- Pteronotus parnellii (Abaco, New Providence; extirpated)
- Pteronotus quadridens (Abaco, Andros, New Providence; extirpated)
- Tadarida brasiliensis (Little Exuma, Abaco; extirpated on New Providence)

=== Turks and Caicos Islands ===
The Turks and Caicos Islands are a group of British islands east of the Bahamas.

- Brachyphylla nana (Grand Caicos)
- Erophylla sezekorni (three of the Caicos Islands, including East Caicos and Grand Caicos)
- Lasiurus minor (Caicos Islands, precise locality unknown)
- Macrotus waterhousii (Grand Caicos; extirpated)
- Monophyllus redmani (Grand Caicos)
- Natalus major (Grand Caicos; extirpated)
- Tadarida brasiliensis (Grand Caicos; extirpated)

=== Cozumel ===
Cozumel is a large island near the mainland of the Mexican state of Quintana Roo. In addition to the species listed here, Centurio senex, a species of Corynorhinus (possibly C. mexicanus), Glossophaga soricina, Mimon cozumelae, and Molossus rufus have also been mentioned for the island, but the specimens these records were based on may have come from mainland Mexico instead.

- Artibeus jamaicensis
- Artibeus lituratus
- Artibeus phaeotis
- Eumops bonariensis
- Lasiurus blossevillii
- Micronycteris schmidtorum
- Natalus mexicanus
- Nyctinomops laticaudatus
- Pteronotus parnellii

=== Lighthouse Reef ===
Lighthouse Reef is a coral atoll off Belize.

- Artibeus jamaicensis (Half Moon Caye)

=== Roatán ===
Roatán is a Honduran island in the southern Caribbean.

- Artibeus jamaicensis
- Glossophaga soricina
- Molossus molossus
- Saccopteryx bilineata

=== San Andrés ===
San Andrés is a Colombian island, part of the department of San Andrés, Providencia and Santa Catalina, isolated in the southwestern Caribbean.

- Artibeus jamaicensis

=== Providencia ===
Providencia, also known as Old Providence, is another Colombian island in the San Andrés, Providencia and Santa Catalina department.

- Artibeus jamaicensis
- Chilonatalus micropus

=== Escudo de Veraguas ===
Escudo de Veraguas is a small island off northwestern Panama. Despite the fact that it has been isolated from the mainland for only 9000 years, it supports at least two mammals that occur nowhere else, including the bat Dermanura watsoni incomitata and a sloth, Bradypus pygmaeus. Several other mammals on the island also differ from mainland forms.

- Carollia brevicauda
- Dermanura watsoni incomitata
- Glossophaga soricina
- Micronycteris megalotis
- Myotis riparius
- Saccopteryx leptura

=== Isla Margarita ===
Isla Margarita is the largest island of Venezuela. Like Trinidad and Tobago, Isla Margarita is a land-bridge island with a relatively diverse bat fauna.

- Desmodus rotundus
- Diaemus youngi
- Glossophaga longirostris
- Glossophaga soricina
- Leptonycteris curasoae
- Micronycteris megalotis
- Molossus molossus
- Mormoops megalophylla
- Peropteryx trinitatis
- Phyllostomus discolor
- Phyllostomus hastatus
- Pteronotus parnellii
- Saccopteryx leptura

== See also ==
- List of North American bats
- List of Mexican bats
- List of Central American bats
- List of South American bats

== Literature cited ==
- Anderson, R.P. and Handley, C.O., Jr. (2001). "A new species of three-toed sloth (Mammalia: Xenarthra) from Panama, with a review of the genus Bradypus". Proceedings of the Biological Society of Washington. 114: 1–33.
- Baird, A.B., Hillis, D.M., Patton, J.C. and Bickham, J.W. (2008). "Evolutionary history of the genus Rhogeessa (Chiroptera: Vespertilionidae) as revealed by mitochondrial DNA sequences". Journal of Mammalogy. 89 (3): 744–754.
- Bakker, J.P. (1999). "The mammals of Aruba". Mededeling 46 van de Vereniging voor Zoogdierkunde en Zoogdierbescherming. (in Dutch).
- Engstrom, M.D., Schmidt, C.A., Morales, J.C. and Dowler, R.C. (1989). "Records of mammals from Isla Cozumel, Quintana Roo, Mexico". The Southwestern Naturalist. 34 (3): 413–415.
- Escobedo-Cabrera, E., León-Paniagua, L. and Arroyo-Cabrales, J. (2006). "Geographic distribution and some taxonomic comments of Micronycteris schmidtorum Sanborn (Chiroptera: Phyllostomidae) in Mexico". Caribbean Journal of Science. 42 (1): 129–135.
- Gardner, A.L. (ed.) (2007). Mammals of South America. Volume 1: Marsupials, xenarthrans, shrews, and bats. University of Chicago Press. ISBN 978-0-226-28240-4
- Geluso, K., Harner, M.J., Lemen, C.A. and Freeman, P.W. (2009). "A survey of bats in northern Trinidad late in the rainy season". Occasional Papers, Museum of Texas Tech University. 285: 1–13.
- Genoways, H.H. (1998). "Two new subspecies of bats of the genus Sturnira from the Lesser Antilles, West Indies". Occasional Papers, Museum of Texas Tech University. 176: 1–7.
- Genoways, H.H., Phillips, C.J. and Baker, R.J. (1998). "Bats of the Antillean island of Grenada: a new zoogeographic perspective". Occasional Papers, Museum of Texas Tech University. 177: 1–28.
- Genoways, H.H., Baker, R.J., Bickham, J.W. and Phillips, C.J. (2005). "Bats of Jamaica". Special Publications, Museum of Texas Tech University. 48: 1–154.
- Genoways, H.H., Pedersen, S.C., Phillips, C.J. and Gordon, L.K. (2007a). "Bats of Anguilla, northern Lesser Antilles". Occasional Papers, Texas Tech University. 270:1–12.
- Genoways, H.H., Larsen, P.A., Pedersen, S.C. and Huebschman, J.J. (2007b). "Bats of Saba, Netherlands Antilles: a zoogeographic perspective". Acta Chiropterologica. 9 (1): 97–114.
- Genoways, H.H., Pedersen, S.C., Larsen, P.A., Kwiecinski, G.G. and Huebschman, J.J. (2007c). "Bats of Saint Martin, French West Indies/Sint Maarten, Netherlands Antilles". Mastozoología Neotropical. 14 (2): 169–188.
- Goodwin, G.G. and Greenhall, A.M. (1961). "A review of the bats of Trinidad and Tobago: descriptions, rabies infection, and ecology". Bulletin of the American Museum of Natural History. 122 (3): 191–301.
- Greenhall, Arthur M. (1961). Bats in Agriculture. Ministry of Agriculture. Trinidad and Tobago.
- Hall, E.R. (1981). The Mammals of North America. 2 volumes. Ronald Press.
- IUCN. (2009). IUCN Red List of Threatened Species. Version 2009.1.
- Jones, J.K., Jr., and Lawlor, T.E. (1965). "Mammals from Isla Cozumel, México, with description of a new species of harvest mouse". University of Kansas Publications, Museum of Natural History. 16: 409–419.
- Kalko, E.K.V. and Handley, C.E. (1994). "Evolution, biogeography, and description of a new species of fruit-eating bat, genus Artibeus Leach (1821), from Panamá". Zeitschrift für Säugetierkunde. 59: 257–273.
- Koopman, K.F. (1959). "The zoogeographical limits of the West Indies". Journal of Mammalogy. 40 (2): 236–240.
- Kwiecinski, G.G. and Coles, W.C. (2007). "Presence of Stenoderma rufum beyond the Puerto Rican Bank". Occasional Papers, Museum of Texas Tech University. 266: 1–9.
- Larsen, P.A., Genoways, H.H. and Pedersen, S.C. (2006). "New records of bats from Saint Barthélemy, French West Indies". Mammalia. 70 (3–4): 321–325.
- Larsen, P.A., Hoofer, S.R., Bozeman, M.C., Pedersen, S.C., Genoways, H.H., Phillips, C.J., Pumo, D.E. and Baker, R.J. (2007). "Phylogenetics and phylogeography of the Artibeus jamaicensis complex based on cytochrome-b DNA sequences". Journal of Mammalogy. 88 (3): 712–727.
- Larsen, R.J., Boegler, K.A., Genoways, H.H., Masefield, W.P., Kirsch, R.A. and Pedersen, S.C. (2007). "Mist netting bias, species accumulation curves, and the rediscovery of two bats on Montserrat (Lesser Antilles)". Acta Chiropterologica. 9 (2): 423–435.
- Larsen, R.J., Larsen, P.A., Genoways, H.H., Catzeflis, F.M., Geluso, K., Kwiecinski, G.G., Pedersen, S.C., Simal, F. and Baker, R.J. (2012). "Evolutionary history of Caribbean species of Myotis, with evidence of a third Lesser Antillean endemic". Mammalian Biology. 77: 124–134.
- Lazell, J. (1989). Wildlife of the Florida Keys: A Natural History. Island Press ISBN 978-0-933280-98-4
- Mancina, C.A. (2005). "Pteronotus macleayii". Mammalian Species. 778: 1–3.
- Mancina, C.A. and García-Rivera, L. (2005). "New genus and species of fossil bat (Chiroptera: Phyllostomidae) from Cuba". Caribbean Journal of Science. 41 (1): 22–27.
- McDonough, M.M., Ammerman, L.K., Timm, R.M., Genoways, H.H., Larsen, P.A. and Baker, R.J. (2008). "Speciation within bonneted bats (genus Eumops): The complexity of morphological, mitochondrial, and nuclear data sets in systematics". Journal of Mammalogy. 89 (5): 1306–1315.
- Moratelli, R.; Wilson, D. E.; Novaes, R. L. M.; Helgen, K. M.; Gutiérrez, E. E. (2017-06-07). "Caribbean Myotis (Chiroptera, Vespertilionidae), with description of a new species from Trinidad and Tobago". Journal of Mammalogy. 98 (4): 994–1008. doi:10.1093/jmammal/gyx062. hdl:2440/116311.
- Morgan, G.S. (1994a). "Mammals of the Cayman Islands". pp. 435–463 in Brunt, M.A. and Davies, J.E. (eds.). The Cayman Islands: Natural History and Biogeography. Springer. ISBN 978-0-7923-2462-1
- Morgan, G.S. (1994b). "Late Quaternary fossil vertebrates from the Cayman Islands". pp. 465–508 in Brunt, M.A. and Davies, J.E. (eds.). The Cayman Islands: Natural History and Biogeography. Springer. ISBN 978-0-7923-2462-1
- Morgan, G.S. (2001). "Patterns of extinction in West Indian bats". pp. 369–407 in Woods, C.A. and Sergile, F.E. (eds.). Biogeography of the West Indies: Patterns and Perspectives. CRC Press, Boca Raton, Florida.
- Morgan, G.S. and Woods, C.A. (1986). "Extinction and the zoogeography of West Indian land mammals". Biological Journal of the Linnean Society. 28: 167–203.
- Pedersen, S.C., Genoways, H.H. and Freeman, P.W. (1996). "Notes on bats from Montserrat (Lesser Antilles) with comments concerning the effects of hurricane Hugo". Caribbean Journal of Science. 32 (2): 206–213.
- Pedersen, S.C., Genoways, H.H., Morton, M.N., Johnson, J.W. and Courts, S.E. (2003). "Bats of Nevis, northern Lesser Antilles". Acta Chiropterologica. 5 (2): 251–267.
- Pedersen, S.C., Genoways, H.H., Morton, M.N., Kwiecinski, G.G. and Courts, S.E. (2005). "Bats of St. Kitts (St. Christopher), northern Lesser Antilles, with comments regarding capture rates of Neotropical bats". Caribbean Journal of Science. 41 (4): 744–760.
- Pedersen, S.C., Genoways, H.H., Morton, M.N., Swier, V.J., Larsen, P.A., Lindsay, K.C., Adams, R.A. and Appino, J.D. (2006). "Bats of Antigua, northern Lesser Antilles". Occasional Papers, Museum of Texas Tech University. 249: 1–18.
- Pedersen, S.C., Larsen, P.A., Genoways, H.H., Morton, M.N., Lindsay, K.C. and Cindric, J. (2007). "Bats of Barbuda, northern Lesser Antilles". Occasional Papers, Texas Tech University. 271: 1–19.
- Petit, S. (1996). "The status of bats on Curaçao". Biological Conservation. 77: 27–31.
- Simmons, N.B. (2005). "Order Chiroptera". pp. 312–529 in Wilson, D.E. and Reeder, D.M. (eds.). Mammal Species of the World: A Taxonomic and Geographic Reference. 3rd ed. Baltimore: The Johns Hopkins University Press, 2 vols.. ISBN 978-0-8018-8221-0
- Suárez, W. (2005). "Taxonomic status of the Cuban vampire bat (Chiroptera: Phyllostomidae: Desmodontinae: Desmodus)". Caribbean Journal of Science. 41 (4): 761–767.
- Suárez, W. and Díaz-Franco, S. (2003). "A new fossil bat (Chiroptera: Phyllostomidae) from a Quaternary cave deposit in Cuba". Caribbean Journal of Science. 39 (3): 371–377.
- Tavares, V. da. C. and Mancina, C.A. (2008). "Phyllops falcatus (Chiroptera: Phyllostomidae)". Mammalian Species. 811: 1–7.
- Tejedor, A., Tavares, V. da C. and Silva-Taboada, G. (2005). "A revision of extant Greater Antillean bats of the genus Natalus". American Museum Novitates. 3493: 1–22.
- Tejedor, A. (2006). "The type locality of Natalus stramineus (Chiroptera: Natalidae): implications for the taxonomy and biogeography of the genus Natalus". Acta Chiropterologica. 8 (2): 361–380.
- Timm, R.M. and Genoways, H.H. (2003). "West Indian mammals from the Albert Schwartz collection: Biological and historical information". Scientific Papers, Natural History Museum, University of Kansas. 29: 1–47.
- Whitaker, J.O. and Hamilton, W.J. (1998). Mammals of the Eastern United States. Cornell University Press. ISBN 978-0-8014-3475-4
