= List of mormoopids =

Species in mammal family Mormoopidae

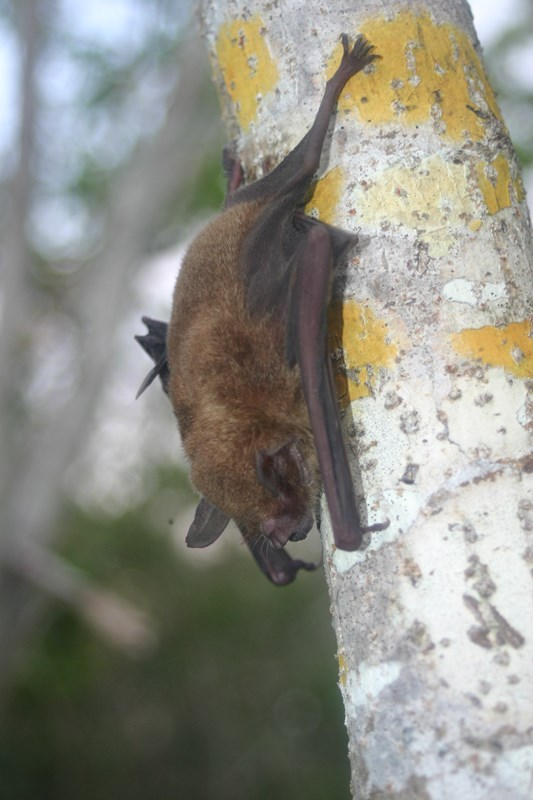
Parnell's mustached bat (Pteronotus parnellii)

Mormoopidae is one of the twenty families of bats in the mammalian order Chiroptera and is part of the microbat suborder. Members of this family are called mormoopids (Latin pronunciation: [/ˌmɔrmoʊˈɑpəds/]) and include ghost-faced bats, naked-backed bats, and mustached bats. They are found in South America, Central America, and southern North America, primarily in forests and caves, though some can be found in savannas. They range in size from the sooty mustached bat, at 4 cm (2 in) plus a 1 cm (0.4 in) tail, to the ghost-faced bat, at 8 cm (3 in) plus a 4 cm (2 in) tail. Like all bats, mormoopids are capable of true and sustained flight, and have forearm lengths ranging from 3 cm (1 in) to 7 cm (3 in). They are all insectivorous. No mormoopids have population estimates, though the Paraguana moustached bat is categorized as an endangered species.

The eighteen extant species of Mormoopidae are divided into two genera: Mormoops, with two species, and Pteronotus, with nine species. A few extinct prehistoric mormoopid species have been discovered, though due to ongoing research and discoveries the exact number and categorization is not fixed.

== Conventions ==
IUCN Red List categories
Conservation status
- EX: Extinct (0 species)
- EW: Extinct in the wild (0 species)
- CR: Critically endangered (0 species)
- EN: Endangered (1 species)
- VU: Vulnerable (0 species)
- NT: Near threatened (0 species)
- LC: Least concern (10 species)

Other categories
- DD: Data deficient (0 species)
- NE: Not evaluated (7 species)

The author citation for the species or genus is given after the scientific name; parentheses around the author citation indicate that this was not the original taxonomic placement. Conservation status codes listed follow the International Union for Conservation of Nature (IUCN) Red List of Threatened Species. Range maps are provided wherever possible; if a range map is not available, a description of the mormoopid's range is provided. Ranges and author citations are based on the IUCN Red List for that species unless otherwise noted.

== Classification ==
The family Mormoopidae consists of eighteen species in two genera: Mormoops and Pteronotus.

Family Mormoopidae

- Genus Mormoops (ghost-faced bats): two species
- Genus Pteronotus (mustached bats): sixteen species

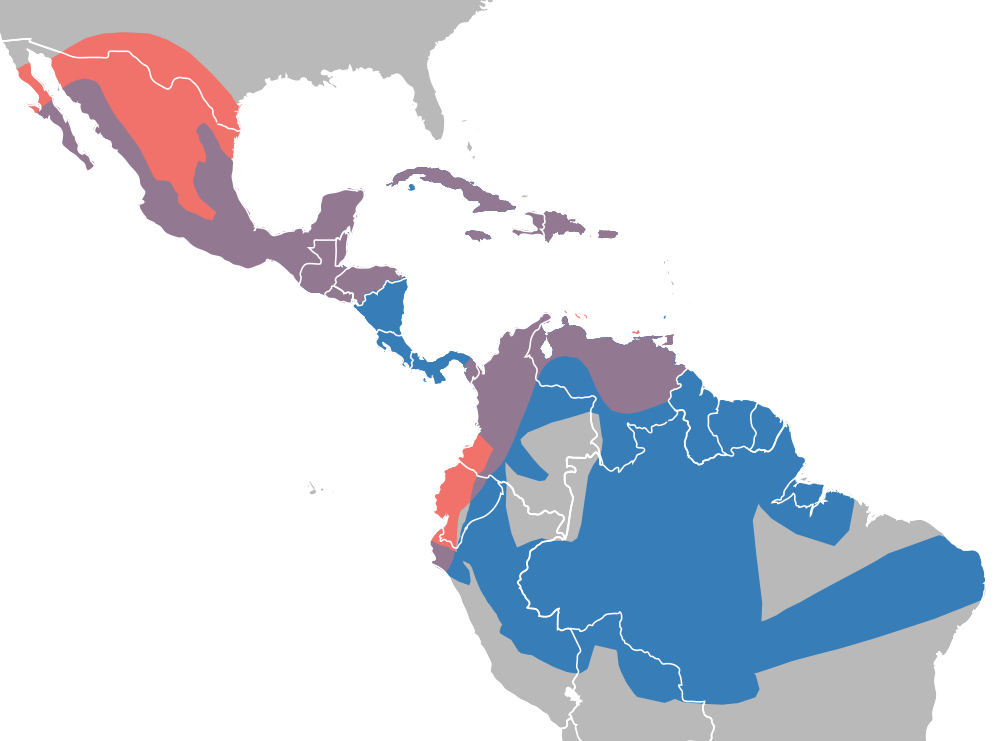
Mormoopidae distribution; Mormoops in red, Pteronotus in blue, overlap in purple

== Mormoopids ==
The following classification is based on the taxonomy described by the reference work Mammal Species of the World (2005), with augmentation by generally accepted proposals made since using molecular phylogenetic analysis, as supported by both the IUCN SSC Bat Specialist Group and the American Society of Mammalogists.

Genus Mormoops – Leach, 1821 – two species
Common name	Scientific name and subspecies	Range	Size and ecology	IUCN status and estimated population
Antillean ghost-faced bat	M. blainvillei Leach, 1821	Caribbean	Size: 5–6 cm (2 in) long, plus 2–3 cm (1 in) tail 4–5 cm (2 in) forearm length Habitat: Caves	LC Unknown
Ghost-faced bat	M. megalophylla (Peters, 1864) Four subspecies: M. m. carteri; M. m. intermedia; M. m. megalophylla; M. m. tumidiceps	Southern North America, Central America, and northern South America	Size: 5–8 cm (2–3 in) long, plus 1–4 cm (0.4–1.6 in) tail 5–7 cm (2–3 in) forearm length Habitat: Forest and caves	LC Unknown

Genus Pteronotus – Gray, 1838 – sixteen species
Common name	Scientific name and subspecies	Range	Size and ecology	IUCN status and estimated population
Big naked-backed bat	P. gymnonotus (Wagner, 1843)	Mexico, Central America, and northern South America	Size: 5–7 cm (2–3 in) long, plus 1–3 cm (0.4–1.2 in) tail 5–6 cm (2 in) forearm length Habitat: Forest, savanna, and caves	LC Unknown
Clarion mustached bat	P. alitonus Pavan, Bobrowiec, & Percequillo, 2018	Northeastern South America	Size: 6–7 cm (2–3 in) long, plus 2–4 cm (1–2 in) tail 5–7 cm (2–3 in) forearm length Habitat: Caves and forest	NE Unknown
Davy's naked-backed bat	P. davyi Gray, 1838 Two subspecies: P. d. davyi; P. d. incae	Mexico, Central America, and northern South America	Size: 5–6 cm (2 in) long, plus 1–3 cm (0.4–1.2 in) tail 4–5 cm (2 in) forearm length Habitat: Forest and caves	LC Unknown
Dusky mustached bat	P. fuscus J. A. Allen, 1911	Northern South America	Size: 6–8 cm (2–3 in) long, plus 2–3 cm (1 in) tail 5–7 cm (2–3 in) forearm length Habitat: Caves and forest	NE Unknown
Macleay's mustached bat	P. macleayii (Gray, 1839) Two subspecies: P. m. griseus; P. m. macleayii	Cuba and Jamaica	Size: 4–6 cm (2 in) long, plus 2–3 cm (1 in) tail 4–5 cm (2 in) forearm length Habitat: Caves	LC Unknown
Mesoamerican common mustached bat	P. mesoamericanus Smith, 1972	Southern Mexico and Central America	Size: 7–8 cm (3–3 in) long, plus 2–3 cm (1 in) tail 5–7 cm (2–3 in) forearm length Habitat: Forest	LC Unknown
Mexican mustached bat	P. mexicanus Miller, 1902	Mexico	Size: 6–7 cm (2–3 in) long, plus 1–3 cm (0.4–1.2 in) tail 5–6 cm (2 in) forearm length Habitat: Caves and forest	NE Unknown
Paraguana moustached bat	P. paraguanensis (Linares & Ojasti, 1974)	Northern Venezuela	Size: 6–7 cm (2–3 in) long, plus 1–3 cm (0.4–1.2 in) tail 5–6 cm (2 in) forearm length Habitat: Forest and caves	EN Unknown
Parnell's mustached bat	P. parnellii Gray, 1843 Two subspecies: P. p. gonavensis; P. p. parnellii	Mexico, Central America, and northern and central South America	Size: About 6 cm (2 in) long, plus 1–3 cm (0.4–1.2 in) tail 5–6 cm (2 in) forearm length Habitat: Caves and forest	LC Unknown
Puerto Rican mustached bat	P. portoricensis Miller, 1902	Puerto Rico	Size: 5–7 cm (2–3 in) long, plus 1–3 cm (0.4–1.2 in) tail 5–6 cm (2 in) forearm length Habitat: Caves and forest	NE Unknown
Sooty mustached bat	P. quadridens (Gundlach, 1840) Two subspecies: P. q. fuliginosus; P. q. quadridens	Caribbean	Size: 4–5 cm (2 in) long, plus 1–3 cm (0.4–1.2 in) tail 3–4 cm (1–2 in) forearm length Habitat: Caves	LC Unknown
Tawny naked-backed bat	P. fulvus Thomas, 1892	Mexico and northern Central America	Size: 4–6 cm (2 in) long, plus 2–3 cm (1 in) long tail 4–5 cm (2 in) forearm length Habitat: Forest and caves	NE Unknown
Tehuantepec mustached bat	P. psilotis Dobson, 1878	Mexico and northern Central America	Size: 4–6 cm (2 in) long, plus 1–2 cm (0.4–0.8 in) long tail 4–5 cm (2 in) forearm length Habitat: Caves and forest	NE Unknown
Tiny mustached bat	P. pusillus G. M. Allen, 1917	Dominican Republic and Haiti	Size: About 5 cm (2 in) long, plus about 2 cm (1 in) tail 4–6 cm (2 in) forearm length Habitat: Caves and forest	NE Unknown
Wagner's common mustached bat	P. rubiginosus Wagner, 1843	Central America and northern South America	Size: 6–8 cm (2–3 in) long, plus 2–4 cm (1–2 in) tail 6–7 cm (2–3 in) forearm length Habitat: Forest	LC Unknown
Wagner's mustached bat	P. personatus Wagner, 1843	Mexico, Central America, and northern and central South America	Size: 4–5 cm (2 in) long, plus 1–3 cm (0.4–1.2 in) tail 4–5 cm (2 in) forearm length Habitat: Forest, savanna, and caves	LC Unknown

== Sources ==
- Chernasky, Amy; Motis, Anna; Burgin, Connor, eds. (2023). All the Mammals of the World. Lynx Nature Books. ISBN 978-84-16728-66-4.
- Simmons, Nancy B. (2005). Wilson, Don E.; Reeder, DeeAnn M. (eds.). Mammal Species of the World. Vol. 1 (3rd ed.). Johns Hopkins University Press. ISBN 978-0-8018-8221-0.
- Nowak, Ronald M. (1994). Walker's Bats of the World. Johns Hopkins University Press. ISBN 978-0-8018-4986-2.
