= Barbados myotis =

Conservation status
- Vulnerable (IUCN 3.1)

Scientific classification
- Kingdom: Animalia
- Phylum: Chordata
- Class: Mammalia
- Order: Chiroptera
- Family: Vespertilionidae
- Genus: Myotis
- Species: M. nyctor

Binomial name
- Myotis nyctor LaVal & Schwartz, 1974

Synonyms
- Myotis martiniquensis nyctor

Species of bat

The Barbados myotis (Myotis nyctor) is a species of bat found in the Lesser Antilles. It was previously considered a subspecies of Schwartz's myotis, Myotis martiniquensis, but was elevated to species rank in 2012.

== Taxonomy and etymology ==
In 1973, American zoologist Richard K. LaVal described Schwartz's myotis from specimens collected in Martinique. A year later in 1974, LaVal identified more Schwartz's myotis in Barbados; he decided that each population was a subspecies. In Martinique, the population would be called M. m. martiniquensis, and the population in Barbados would be called M. m. nyctor. A 2012 study determined that there was a genetic distance of 8-9% between the two subspecies. The two subspecies were actually paraphyletic, with M. m. nyctor more closely related to an unrecognized species in Suriname. On the basis of their genetic and morphological divergence, the authors of the 2012 paper recommended that M. m. nyctor be elevated to species rank, using the name M. nyctor. The population of M. nyctor on Grenada might represent a subspecies.

== Description ==
It is a small bat, with a total body length of 84 mm (3.3 in) and a forearm length of 33.4 mm (1.31 in). Its hind foot is 7 mm (0.28 in) long, and its ear is 13 mm (0.51 in) long. Its skull is 13.5 mm (0.53 in) long. While M. nyctor and M. martiniquensis overlap in several morphological traits, they can be differentiated by M nyctor's longer tibia and its higher tibia-to-forearm ratio. In general, M. nyctor has a larger body but a smaller cranium than M. martiniquensis.

== Range and habitat ==
M. nyctor is found on Barbados, the Lesser Antilles, and possibly Grenada. It was the only species of its genus found on Barbados, until the identification of Myotis attenbourghi in 2017. It is found at elevations between 50–300 m (160–980 ft) above sea level. It roosts in caves during the day, but can also be found in more urbanized environments.

== Conservation ==
It is currently evaluated as vulnerable by the IUCN. It meets the criteria for this designation because it is only found in 2-3 locations, and its estimated area of occupancy is 1,000 km^{2} (390 sq mi). It is threatened by extreme weather events, such as hurricanes. Changes in land use might result in habitat loss for this species. Growth in tourism might result in a reduction of habitat for this species.
