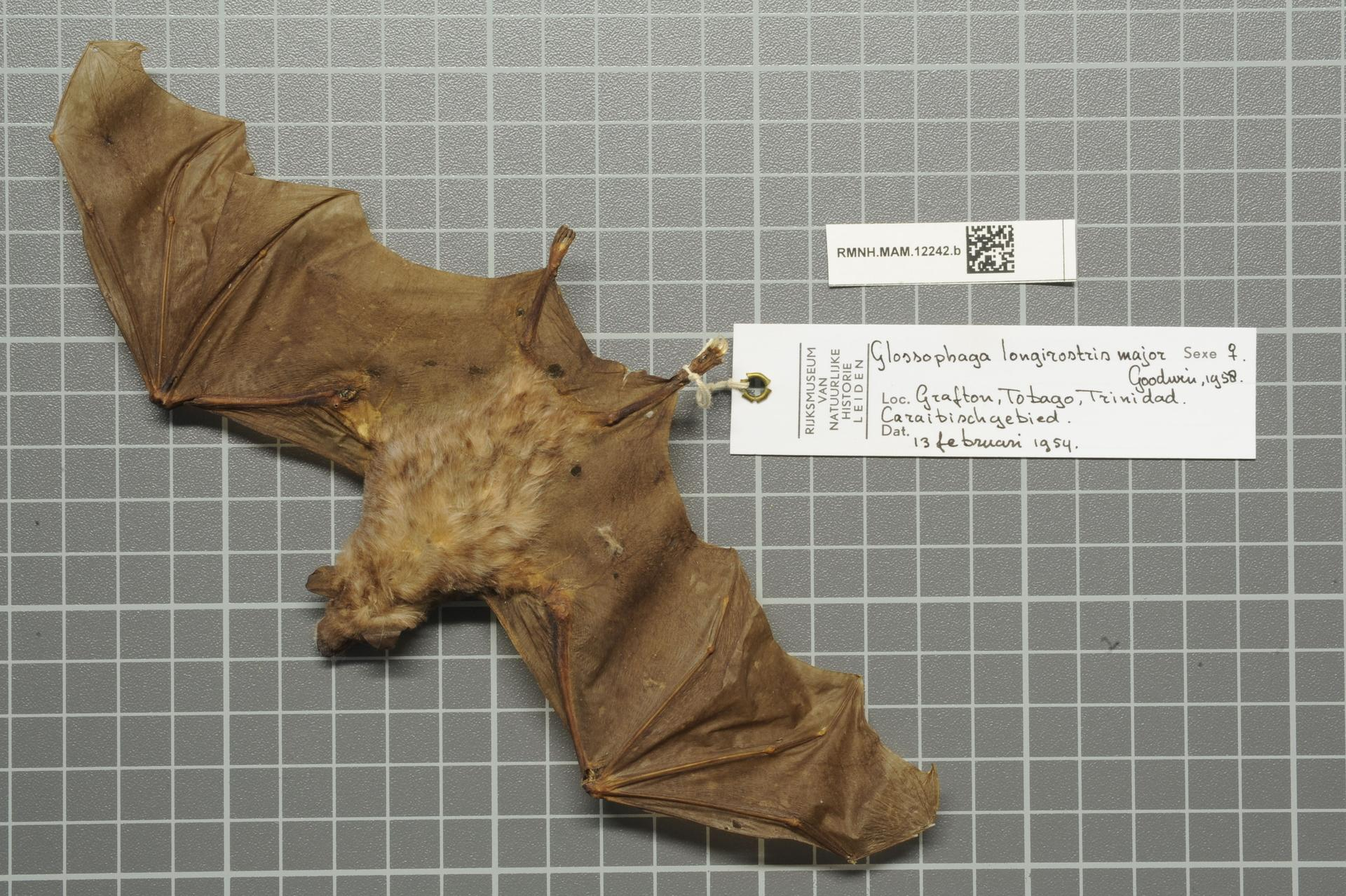

Conservation status
- Least Concern (IUCN 3.1)

Scientific classification
- Kingdom: Animalia
- Phylum: Chordata
- Class: Mammalia
- Order: Chiroptera
- Family: Phyllostomidae
- Genus: Glossophaga
- Species: G. longirostris

Binomial name
- Glossophaga longirostris Miller, 1898

= Miller's long-tongued bat =

Species of bat

Miller's long-tongued bat (Glossophaga longirostris) is a bat species found in northern Brazil, Venezuela, Colombia, Guyana, Trinidad and Tobago, Grenada, the Netherlands Antilles and the U.S. Virgin Islands.

== Taxonomy ==
Miller's long-tongued bat was described as a new species in 1898 by American zoologist Gerrit Smith Miller Jr. The holotype had been collected in the Sierra Nevada de Santa Marta of Colombia by Wilmot W. Brown Jr. Six or seven subspecies are typically recognized.

== Description ==
Glossophaga species are small, with average forearm lengths ranging from 31–42 mm (1.2–1.7 in). Miller's long-tongued bat has a braincase that is equivalent in length to its snout, whereas other members of the genus have a shorter snout relative to the braincase. Its dental formula is 2.1.2.32.1.3.3 for a total of 34 teeth. Males weigh an average of 13.25 g (0.467 oz), while nonpregnant females weigh 12.81 g (0.452 oz).

== Biology ==
Miller's long-tongued bat is nectarivorous, with cacti blossoms as an important food source. Two breeding seasons occur annually: December–April and June–October. The litter size is one pup.

== Range and habitat ==
Miller's long-tongued bat is found in the following countries and territories: Colombia, Venezuela, Trinidad and Tobago, the Netherlands Antilles, Guyana, Brazil, and Ecuador. In the Lesser Antilles its range extends northwards to St. Vincent. They roost in caves, houses, and rock crevices.
