= Eumops ferox =

Conservation status
- Least Concern (IUCN 3.1)

Scientific classification
- Kingdom: Animalia
- Phylum: Chordata
- Class: Mammalia
- Order: Chiroptera
- Family: Molossidae
- Genus: Eumops
- Species: E. ferox

Binomial name
- Eumops ferox Gundlach, 1861
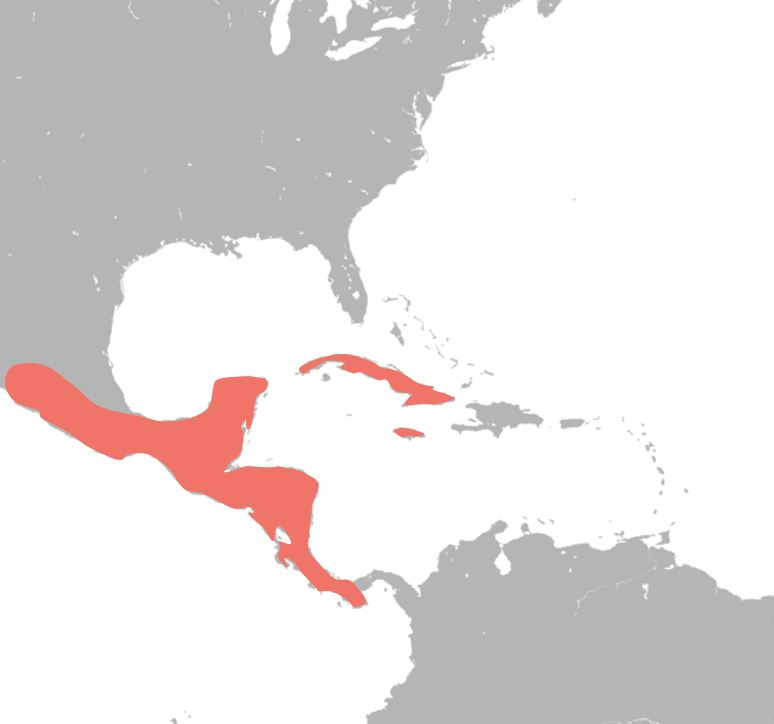

Synonyms
- Molossus ferox Gundlach, 1861; Molossus glaucinus Wagner, 1843; Promops glaucinus Wagner, 1843; Nyctinomus orthotis Allen, 1890

Species of bat

Eumops ferox, the fierce bonneted bat or the chestnut mastiff bat, is a species of free-tailed bat found in the Caribbean and Mexico. Until recently, it was synonymous with Wagner's bonneted bat.

== Taxonomy and etymology ==
It was described as a new species in 1861 by Cuban naturalist Juan Gundlach. Gundlach initially placed it in the genus Molossus, with the name Molossus ferox. It has been considered synonymous with Wagner's bonneted bat, Eumops glaucinus. It was generally recognized as synonymous with Wagner's bonneted bat until a 2008 study concluded that Wagner's bonneted bat was actually a species complex that should be broken into four species: Eumops ferox, the Florida bonneted bat, E. wilsoni, and Wagner's bonneted bat. Its species name "ferox" is of Latin origin meaning "ferocious" or "fierce." When handling an individual in Jamaica, Philip Henry Gosse remarked the following:

When handled, its impatience of confinement is manifested by a continuous screeching, not very loud, but excessivly harsh and shrill . . . The mouth also is then opened widely and threateningly, and a sufficiently grim armature of teeth developed.

== Systematics ==
E. ferox is very closely related to the Florida bonneted bat, Eumops floridanus. The two have a very small genetic distance of 0.013. One analysis using mitochondrial DNA showed that the population of E. ferox in Cuba was more closely related to E. floridanus than it was to the E. ferox in Central America. Authors of another paper hypothesized that E. ferox and E. floridanus were so closely related because their recent divergence caused incomplete lineage sorting.

== Description ==
This is the species of bat that Philip Henry Gosse referred to as the chestnut mastiff bat in his 1851 book, A Naturalist's Sojourn in Jamaica. Its ears are so large that they hang over its face. It has long, narrow wings. Like other members of its genus, it has a gular-thoracic gland, with the glands of the males producing a "very rank odour." Its ears are hairless, while its toes have long, bristly hairs. From head to tail, it is 131–151 mm (5.2–5.9 in). Its tail is 49–58 mm (1.9–2.3 in) long; its forearm is 57 mm (2.2 in) long. Individuals weigh approximately 38 g (1.3 oz).

== Biology ==
E. ferox is a nocturnal species, roosting in sheltered places during the day such as underneath roof shingles. These roosts will consist of multiple individuals, with one roost containing 15 individuals, as it is a colonial species. It emerges from its roost shortly after sunset to forage. It is insectivorous. It is monoestrous, with a single annual breeding season. Pregnant females have been documented April through June, while lactating females have been documented in June and July. The litter size is one young, called a pup. Most females give birth in late June, with lactation lasting 5–6 weeks.

== Range and habitat ==
It is found in the Caribbean, Mexico and Central America.
