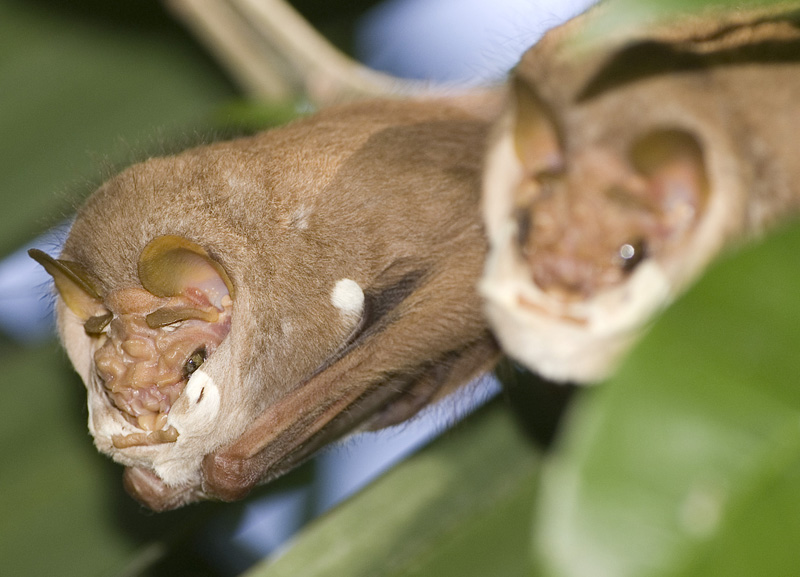

Conservation status
- Least Concern (IUCN 3.1)

Scientific classification
- Kingdom: Animalia
- Phylum: Chordata
- Class: Mammalia
- Order: Chiroptera
- Family: Phyllostomidae
- Genus: Centurio; Gray, 1842
- Species: C. senex

Binomial name
- Centurio senex Gray, 1842

Subspecies
- C. senex senex C. senex greenhalli

= Wrinkle-faced bat =

Species of bat

The wrinkle-faced bat (Centurio senex) is a species of bat in the family Phyllostomidae and the only identified member of the genus Centurio. This bat is found in various countries in and around Central America. It eats fruit but is not classified within the fruit bats, and is instead classified as a leaf-nosed bat even though it does not have a leaf nose. It has an unusually shaped skull which is thought to allow it to eat a wider range of foods than other bats.

== Description ==
Centurio senex is tail-less, medium-sized, and generally has a pelage of a drab brown to yellowish-brown color. It weighs around 17g. Its face is hairless and is covered by convoluted outgrowths of skin (hence the name wrinkle-faced). These skin flaps are more pronounced in males than females. Males also possess a skin mask that can be used to cover their face. The wrinkle-faced bat has storage pouches in its mouth to allow it to store fruit. C. senex subsp. greenhalli differs from the more common C. senex subsp. senex by being larger and in having a more domed braincase, better developed sagittal crest, and relatively shorter maxillary toothrow. Their skulls are extremely short and wide, which is thought to allow them to produce bite forces up to 20% higher than other bats of a similar size. They are able to generate the largest biting force, relative to their size, of any of the leaf-nosed bats.

== Diet ==
The species is entirely frugivorous (fruit-eating) although it is not known which types of fruit it consumes. Elizabeth Dumont from the University of Massachusetts believes that the strong biting force of the bat allows them to survive through times when soft fruit (such as soft bananas, mangoes, papayas, etc.) is scarce as they are able to eat tougher fruit than other bats. Seed predation has been recorded in Mexican populations, which has been suggested as another function of the bite force.

== Reproduction ==
Females are thought to be both polyestrous and asynchronous, pregnant females have been recorded every month between January and August except May. Males emit a musky odour from the chin area to attract females. Their sperm morphology is unique in that the sperm head has a rounded nucleus and extremely pointed acrosome.

Recent research on the bats in Costa Rica suggests that the bats exhibit Lek mating.

== Range ==
Centurio senex subsp. senex is found in Belize, Colombia, Costa Rica, El Salvador, Guatemala, Honduras, Mexico, Nicaragua, Panama and Venezuela. C. senex subsp. greenhalli is only found in Trinidad and Tobago.

== Etymology ==
The binomial name Centurio senex is formed from the Latin centurio meaning division into hundreds and senex referring to old people. This name was chosen as it was thought that the face of the bat looked like that of a one-hundred-year-old man.
