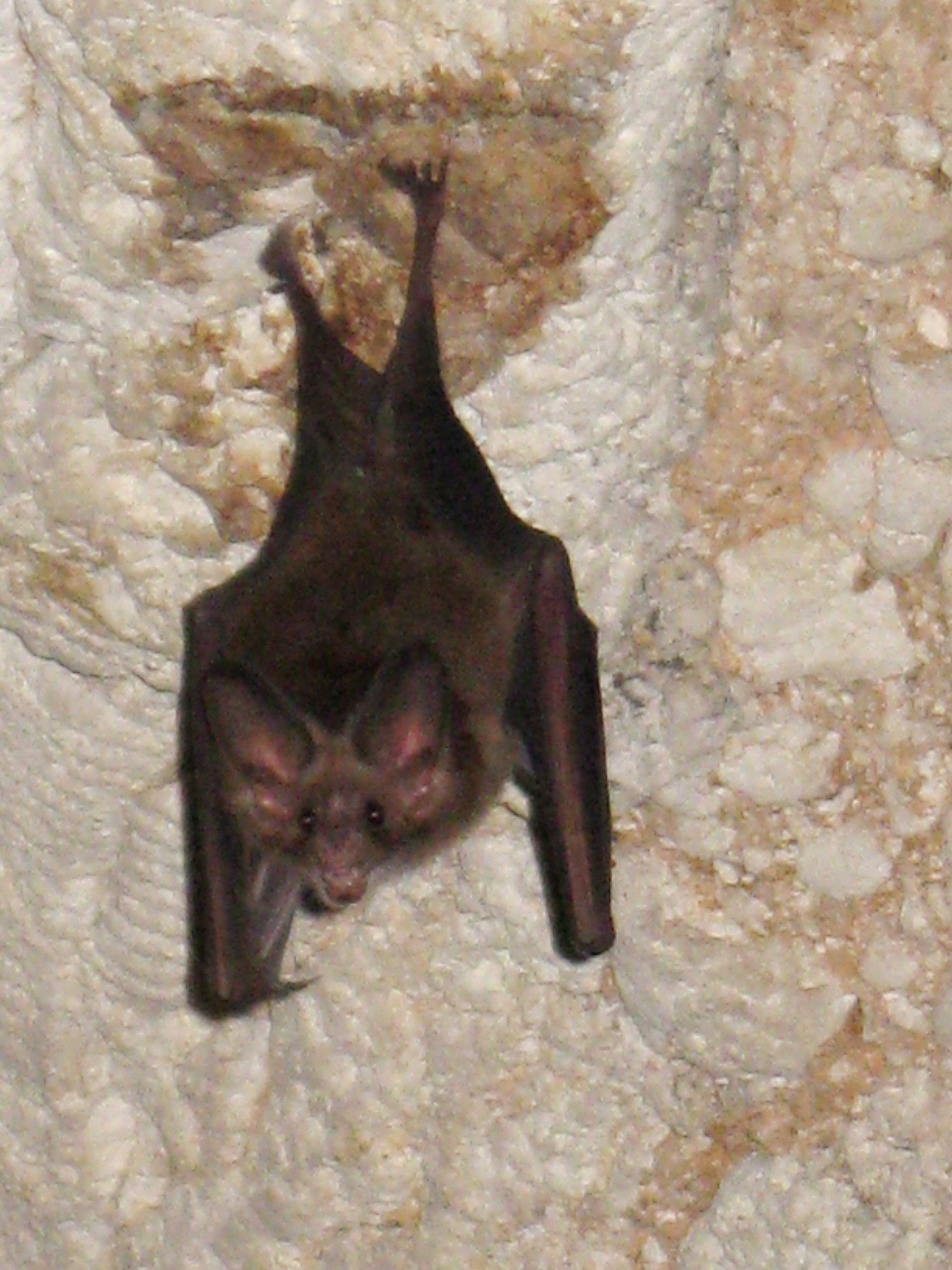

Conservation status
- Least Concern (IUCN 3.1)

Scientific classification
- Kingdom: Animalia
- Phylum: Chordata
- Class: Mammalia
- Infraclass: Placentalia
- Order: Chiroptera
- Family: Phyllostomidae
- Genus: Macrotus
- Species: M. waterhousii

Binomial name
- Macrotus waterhousii Gray, 1843
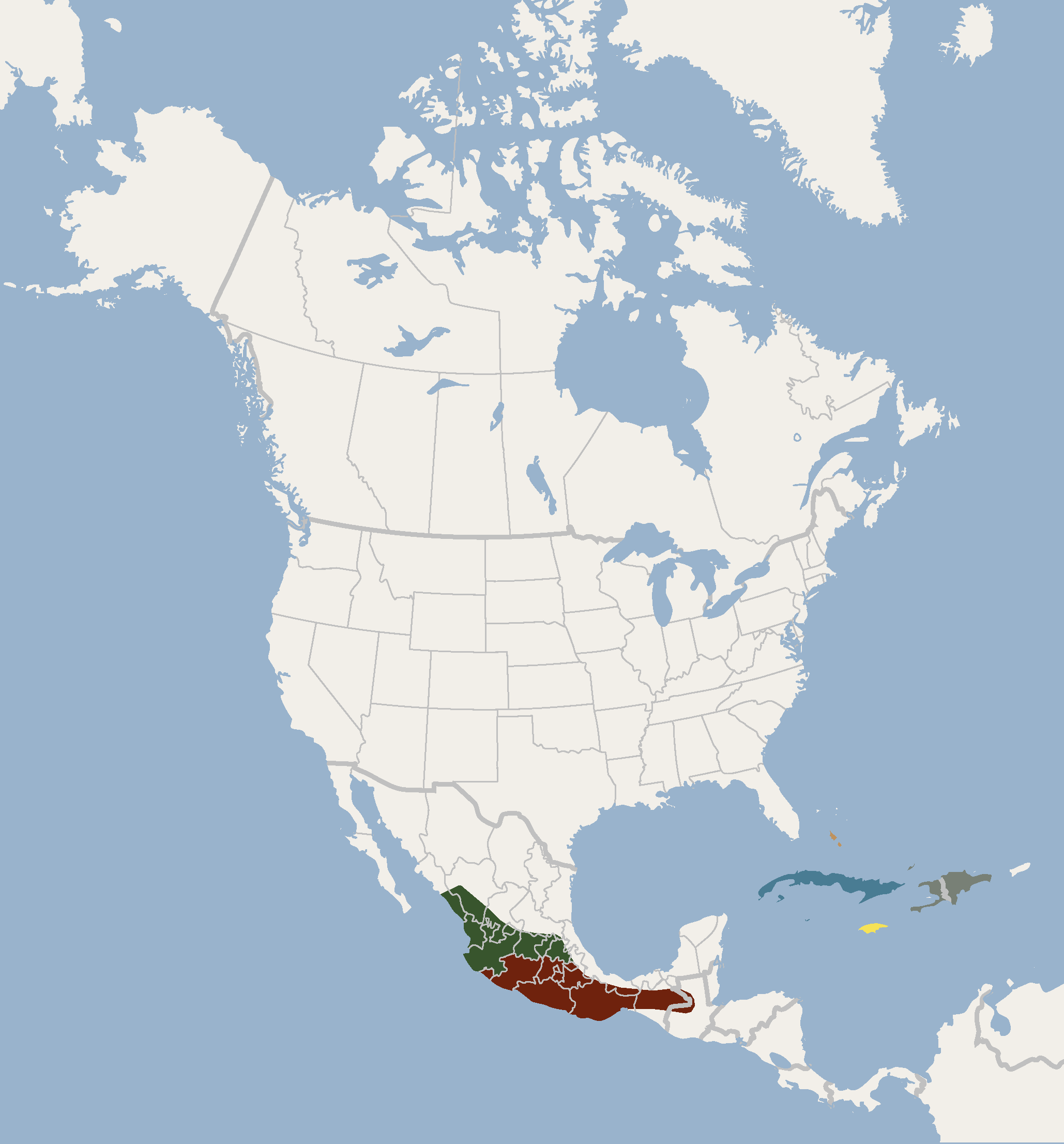

= Waterhouse's leaf-nosed bat =

Species of bat

Waterhouse's leaf-nosed bat (Macrotus waterhousii) is a species of big-eared bat in the family Phyllostomidae. It is found in the Greater Antilles (excluding Puerto Rico) in the Cayman Islands, Cuba, Hispaniola (the Dominican Republic and Haiti) and Jamaica, as well as Mexico (from Sonora to Hidalgo) south to Guatemala.

== Behavior ==
This species roosts primarily in caves, but also in mines and buildings. The species is insectivorous, primarily consuming insects of the order Lepidoptera and Orthoptera.

M. waterhousii does not require complete darkness in its roosting place, and can often be found near the entrance of a cave (with in 10–30 meters), or even partially lit buildings. It is possible to find this species in groups, but not as common as other bats; they are almost never in direct contact with one another. They typically leave their roost about 30 minutes after sundown.

== Reproduction ==
=== Sperm cycle ===
Male M. waterhousii have an interesting cycle in their sperm production and peak times for successful mating. From December to early June, there are no mature sperm found within the male's reproductive tract. Starting in June, the spermatogenic cycle begins, leading to sperm being available (for mating) in August. Mature sperm can be found in the reproductive tract of males from August to early December. However, starting around September, a decrease in testes size can be observed.

=== Delayed development ===
Observed during the pregnancy of female M. waterhousii, there seems to be a delay in the development of the offspring. It is possible that this is controlled by levels of Plasma Thyroxine (T4). During the first two trimester of pregnancy, levels of T4 are relatively low. But during the last trimester (and lactation), levels of T4 more than double typically. These corresponds in the observed delayed development of the offspring, as much of the development happen in that last trimester.

== Echolocation and foraging ==
Like many bats, this species uses echolocation as a means to locate their prey. In particular, Macrotus waterhousii uses a low intensity, broadband-like call to aide in their search for food. The maximum frequency of a call is 73.65 kHz with a minimum of 46.19 kHz, creating a bandwidth of 27.46 kHz. The call ranges from about 1 second to 3 seconds. In addition, to echolocation, M. waterhousii uses the sound made by the prey itself to locate it. This type of foraging behavior leads to a preference for a cluttered habitat. As M. waterhousii is hunting, the frequency of calls decreases as it approaches its prey.

== Parasites ==
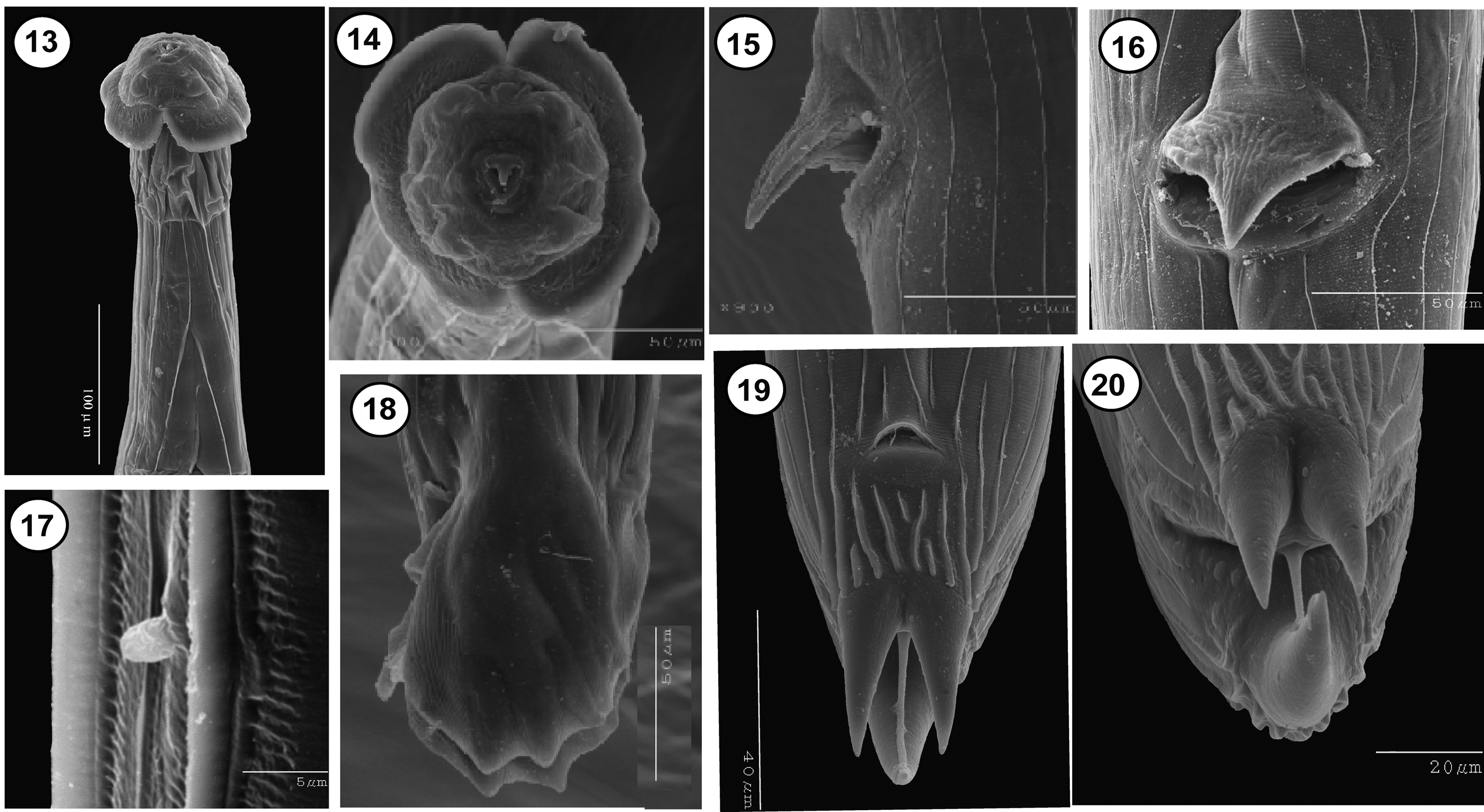
Torrestrongylus tetradorsalis, a nematode parasite of the Waterhouse's leaf-nosed bat in Central Mexico. Scanning electron microscopy.

The nematode Torrestrongylus tetradorsalis was described in 2015. It is a parasite of the small intestine of the Waterhouse's leaf-nosed bat in Central Mexico. It was collected from bats from the Sierra de Huautla Biosphere Reserve in the state of Morelos.
