= Sir David Attenborough's myotis =

Scientific classification
- Kingdom: Animalia
- Phylum: Chordata
- Class: Mammalia
- Order: Chiroptera
- Family: Vespertilionidae
- Genus: Myotis
- Species: M. attenboroughi

Binomial name
- Myotis attenboroughi Moratelli et al., 2017

Species of bat

Sir David Attenborough's myotis (Myotis attenboroughi) is a species of small bat in the family Vespertilionidae that is endemic to the Caribbean island of Tobago. Its presence on nearby Trinidad is as of yet uncertain. It is the only mammal species currently known to be endemic to Trinidad and Tobago. It was named after famed English naturalist Sir David Attenborough.

It was formerly assigned to Myotis nigricans until a 2017 study revealed that it was a distinct, previously unknown species. It is the sister species to a clade containing M. cf. handleyi, M. nesopolus, and 3 possibly undescribed species from South and Central America. It can be distinguished from all other Caribbean Myotis by its small skull and steeply sloping frontals.

It feeds on moths and other small flying nocturnal insects, and roosts in caves, tree hollows, and the attics of buildings.

== See also ==
- List of things named after David Attenborough and his works
