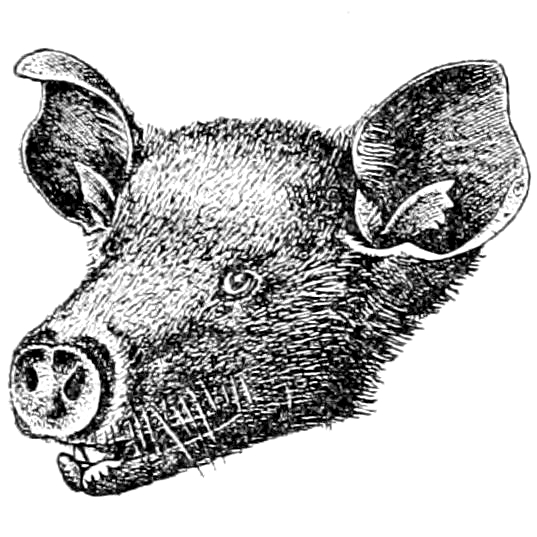
- An illustration of the holotype of Phyllonycteris aphylla, formerly Reithronycteris aphylla

Scientific classification
- Kingdom: Animalia
- Phylum: Chordata
- Class: Mammalia
- Order: Chiroptera
- Family: Phyllostomidae
- Subfamily: Glossophaginae
- Genus: Phyllonycteris; Gundlach, 1861

Type species
- Phyllonycteris poeyi Gundlach, 1861

Species
- P. aphylla P. poeyi

= Phyllonycteris =

Genus of bats

Phyllonycteris is a genus of bat in the family Phyllostomidae. It contains the following species:

- Jamaican flower bat (Phyllonycteris aphylla)
- † Puerto Rican flower bat (Phyllonycteris major)
- Cuban flower bat (Phyllonycteris poeyi)
