= Dominican myotis =

Conservation status
- Vulnerable (IUCN 3.1)

Scientific classification
- Kingdom: Animalia
- Phylum: Chordata
- Class: Mammalia
- Order: Chiroptera
- Family: Vespertilionidae
- Genus: Myotis
- Species: M. dominicensis

Binomial name
- Myotis dominicensis Miller, 1902
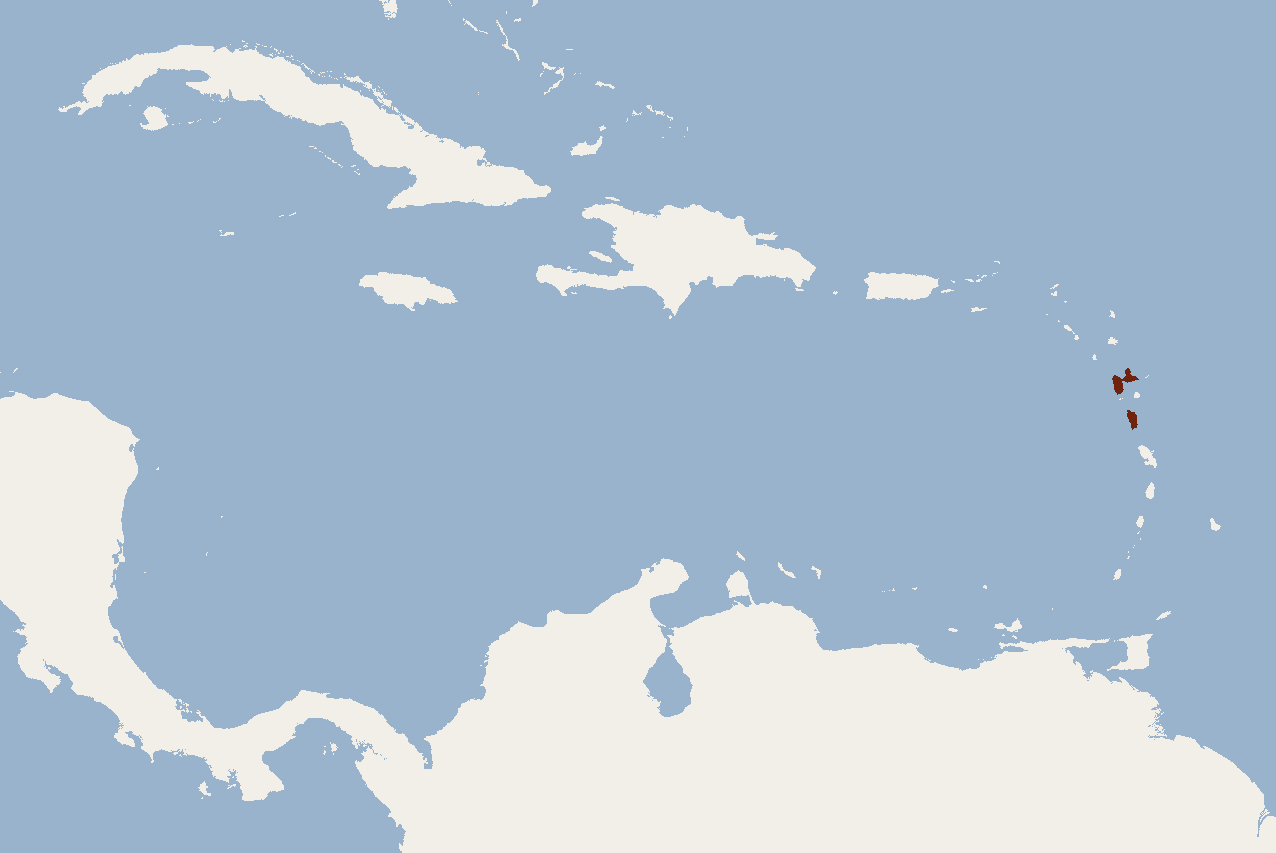

Species of bat

The Dominican myotis (Myotis dominicensis) is a species of vesper bat. It is found in Dominica and Guadeloupe.
