= Brachyphylla =

Scientific classification
- Kingdom: Animalia
- Phylum: Chordata
- Class: Mammalia
- Order: Chiroptera
- Family: Phyllostomidae
- Subfamily: Glossophaginae; Gray, 1866
- Genus: Brachyphylla; Gray, 1834

Type species
- Brachyphylla cavernarum Gray, 1834

Genus of bats

Brachyphylla (Caribbean fruit-eating bat) is a genus of leaf-nosed bats in the family Phyllostomidae. Both species live on islands near or in the Caribbean. The genus contains the following species:

- Cuban fruit-eating bat (B. nana)
- Antillean fruit-eating bat (B. cavernarum)
