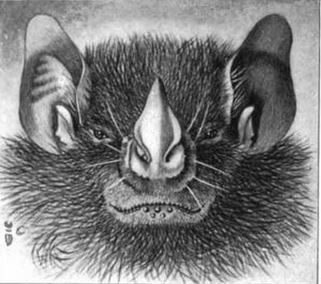

Conservation status
- Least Concern (IUCN 3.1)

Scientific classification
- Kingdom: Animalia
- Phylum: Chordata
- Class: Mammalia
- Order: Chiroptera
- Family: Phyllostomidae
- Genus: Ardops; Miller, 1906
- Species: A. nichollsi

Binomial name
- Ardops nichollsi (Thomas, 1891)

Subspecies
- Ardops nichollsi annectens Miller, 1913; Ardops nichollsi koopmani Jones & Schwartz, 1967; Ardops nichollsi luciae (Miller, 1902); Ardops nichollsi montserratensis (Thomas, 1894); Ardops nichollsi nichollsi (Thomas, 1891)
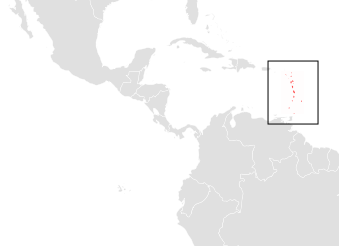
- Tree bat range

Synonyms
- Stenoderma luciae Stenoderma nichollsi

= Tree bat =

Species of bat

The tree bat (Ardops nichollsi) is a species of bat in the family Phyllostomidae and the only species in the genus Ardops. It is found in the Lesser Antilles of the Caribbean, in Antigua, Dominica, Guadeloupe, Martinique, Montserrat, Saint Lucia, Saba, Saint Martin, Sint Eustatius, Saint Kitts, Nevis, Grenada and Saint Vincent and the Grenadines.

== Taxonomy and evolution ==
Ardops nichollsi was described by Oldfield Thomas in 1891 as Stenoderma nichollsi, and assigned to Ardops by Gerrit Smith Miller Jr. in 1906. It is the only species in the genus. Several of the subspecies were initially considered full species, but were reconsidered in a 1967 paper by J. Knox Jones and Albert Schwartz which examined newly collected specimens and found little difference in the variation between the named species. The subspecies vary considerably in size but otherwise are very similar. There are five known subspecies:

- A. n monstserratensis: found on the northern Lesser Antilles, from St. Martin to Marie-Galante. Jones and Schwartz considered A. n. annectens, found on Guadeloupe, Marie-Galate, and Antigua a separate subspecies based on morphological data. However, a 2017 analysis considered it as a synonym of A. n. monsterratensis based on reanalysis of the morphological data, though they did not have any genetic data from bats from Guadeloupe to test directly. A. n. monsterratensis is the largest subspecies.
- A. n. nichollsi: found on Dominica.
- A. n. koopmani: found on Martinique.
- A. n. luciae: found on St. Lucia.
- A. n. vincentensis: found on St. Vincent. Identified by genetic analysis and smaller size in 2017.

The genus is approximately 1.8 to 2.0 million years old.

== Description ==
The tree bat has brown fur, with the back varying from Prout's brown to buffy brown and the front "rich brownish, tinged with grayish white". There is a white spot where the wing meets the body, typically more prominent in females than males.

The species is sexually dimorphic, with females larger than the males. The magnitude of the sexual dimorphism varies between the subspecies.

== Behaviour and ecology ==
The tree bat, as the name suggests, roosts in trees. Its habitat is typically forest. It is a frugivore.

== In popular culture ==
The tree bat has been featured on the $7.5 stamp of Grenada, and a $4 stamp from Montserrat.
