= Puerto Rican flower bat =

Puerto Rican flower bat Temporal range: Quaternary

Conservation status
- Extinct (IUCN 3.1)

Scientific classification
- Kingdom: Animalia
- Phylum: Chordata
- Class: Mammalia
- Order: Chiroptera
- Family: Phyllostomidae
- Genus: Phyllonycteris
- Species: †P. major

Binomial name
- †Phyllonycteris major Anthony, 1917

Species of mammal

The Puerto Rican flower bat (Phyllonycteris major) is an extinct species of bat from the family Phyllostomidae (leaf-nosed bats). It was native to Puerto Rico and is known only from subfossil skeletal material.

== Sources ==
- UNEP-WCMC Species Database
- Bucknell University - Wilson & Reeder's: Mammal Species of the World (Third edition)
- ZipCodeZoo.com
