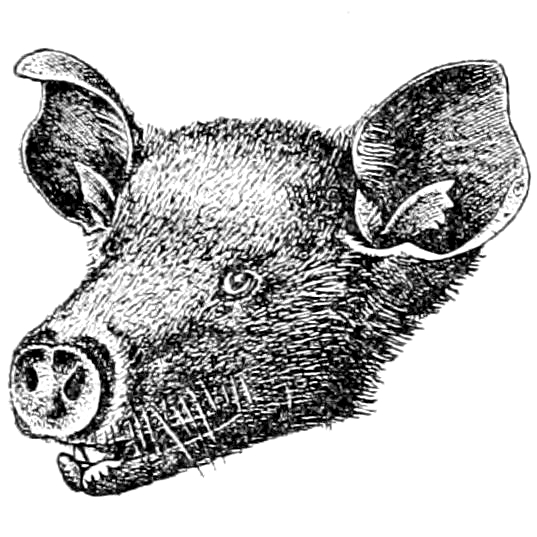

Conservation status
- Critically Endangered (IUCN 3.1)

Scientific classification
- Kingdom: Animalia
- Phylum: Chordata
- Class: Mammalia
- Order: Chiroptera
- Family: Phyllostomidae
- Genus: Phyllonycteris
- Species: P. aphylla

Binomial name
- Phyllonycteris aphylla (Miller, 1898)
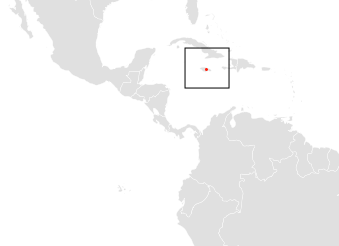

= Jamaican flower bat =

Species of bat

The Jamaican flower bat (Phyllonycteris aphylla) is a critically endangered species of bat in the family Phyllostomidae. It is endemic to Jamaica.

== Taxonomy and etymology ==
It was described by American zoologist Gerrit Smith Miller Jr. in 1898. He initially placed it in the genus Reithronycteris, which is now synonymous with Phyllonycteris. The specimen that he described was collected in Jamaica; the date of collection and the exact location are unknown. The type specimen used to describe the species has since been lost. Its species name aphylla was derived from the Ancient Greek word áphullos, meaning "leafless." This is likely in reference to its small nose-leaf.

== Description ==
It weighs 14–18 g (0.49–0.63 oz). Its total body length is 88 mm (3.5 in). Its forearm is 48 mm (1.9 in) long. On the dorsal side of the forearm, its skin is pink. Its ears are 16 mm (0.63 in) long and 12 mm (0.47 in) wide. The tragus is 8 mm (0.31 in). It has a disc-shaped, basic nose-leaf at the end of its snout. The fur is short, with individual hairs approximately 6 mm (0.24 in) long on its back and 4 mm (0.16 in) long on its belly. Its feet are very large in relation to its body, at 17 mm (0.67 in), and the uropatagium lacks a calcar. Like other members of the Glossophaginae subfamily, it has a long tongue tipped with lingual papillae. Its skull is larger and more robust than most other Glossophagines, though. Fur is silky in texture. Dorsal fur is blond or light gold, while ventral fur is almost white. Its flight membranes are dark brown or almost black in color.

== Biology ==
It is a social species, living in colonies with other members of its species and other species of bat. Its colonies can number several hundred individuals. It depends on caves for roosting habitat, and cannot exist without them. Little is known about its reproduction, though Goodwin 1970 reported finding a pregnant female in January, per McFarlane 1986. It eats fruit, pollen, nectar, and possibly insects. In 1965, a female individual was held in captivity for one month before dying, living on a diet of banana, papaya, mango, and canned fruit nectar.

== Range and habitat ==
It is only found on Jamaica. It is currently only known to roost in four caves: Marta Tick Cave, Green Grotto Caves, Rock Spring Caverns and the largest population at Stony Hill Cave. Previously, a "sizeable colony"–the only one known for this species–roosted in St. Clair Cave, although the Jamaican flower bat is no longer found there. Per McFarlane 1986, Goodwin 1970 stated that the bat could be found in three caves: St. Clair Cave, Riverhead Cave, and Mt. Plenty Cave. Goodwin also stated that fossilized remains of the species had been found in Wallingford and Runaway Bay Caves.

== Conservation ==
As of 2015, it is currently evaluated as critically endangered by the IUCN. It meets the criteria for this evaluation because it is only known from two caves, the population size is estimated at fewer than 500 individuals, and its population size is likely in decline. The Jamaican flower bat used to occur in five or six caves, but now only occurs in two. Part of its decline in St. Clair Cave may be attributed to the population of feral cats living in the cave and preying on bats. Its estimated area of occupancy is 400 km^{2} (150 sq mi). From 2008 to 2015, the IUCN had listed this species as least concern, which is the lowest risk level of extinction. This species is threatened by human disturbance to caves.
