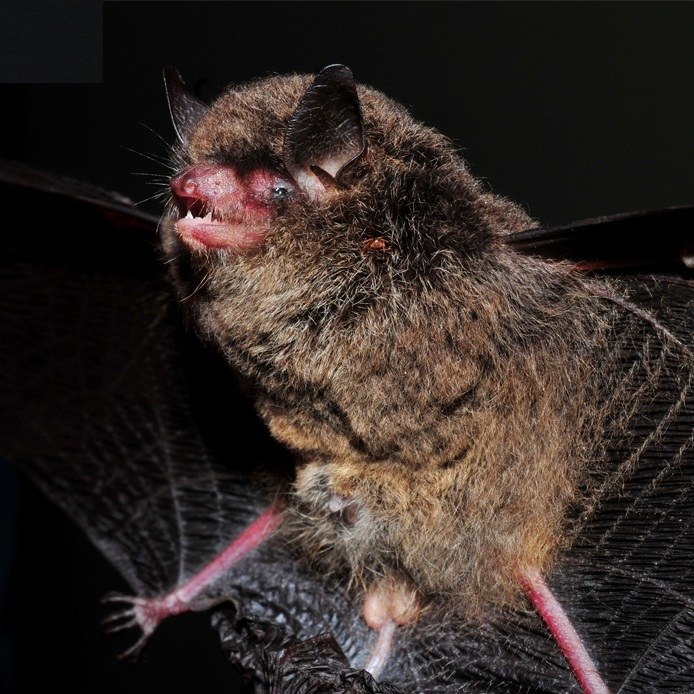

Conservation status
- Least Concern (IUCN 3.1)

Scientific classification
- Kingdom: Animalia
- Phylum: Chordata
- Class: Mammalia
- Order: Chiroptera
- Family: Vespertilionidae
- Genus: Myotis
- Species: M. riparius

Binomial name
- Myotis riparius Handley, 1960
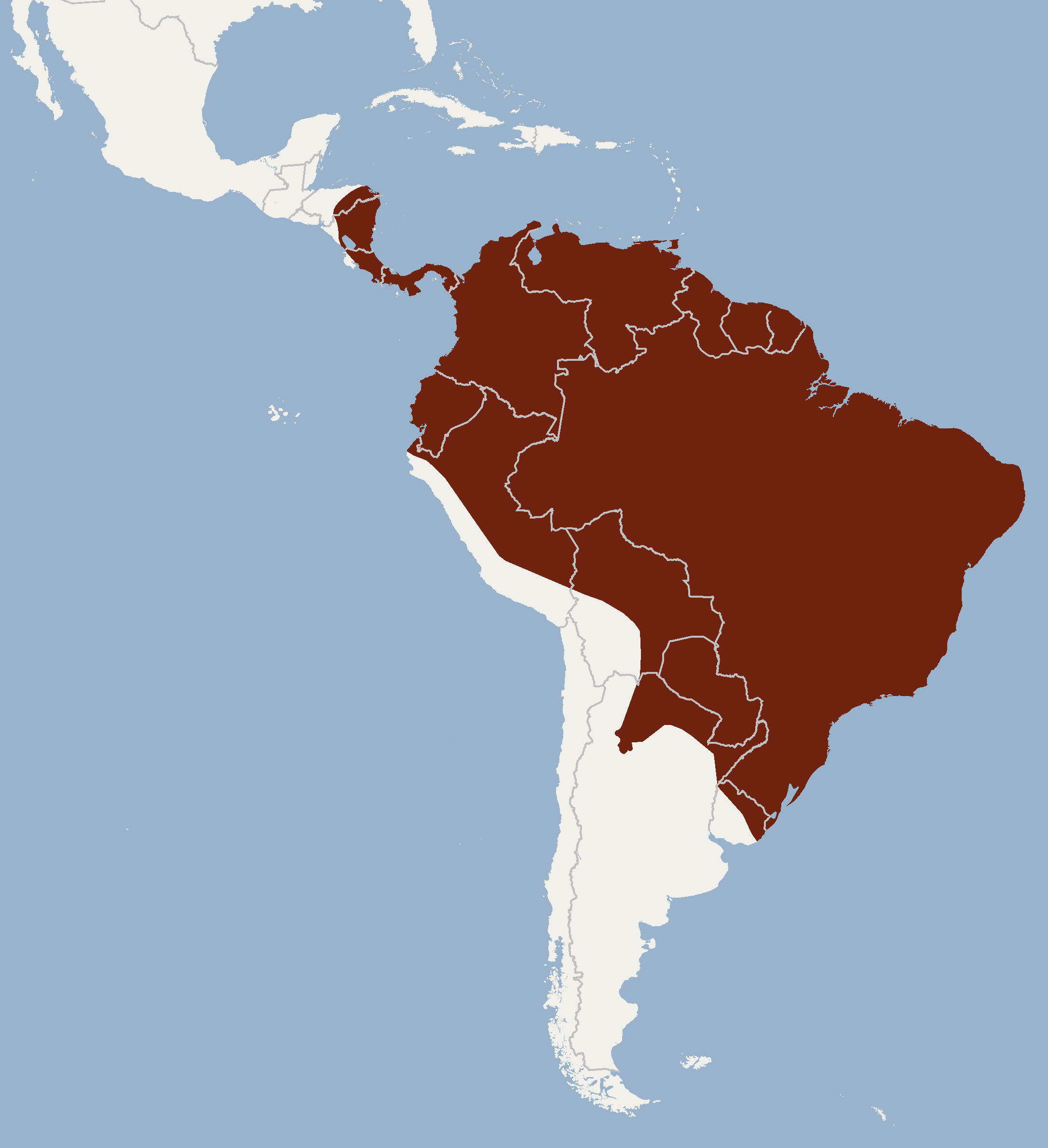

= Riparian myotis =

Species of bat

The riparian myotis (Myotis riparius) is a vespertilionid bat species from South and Central America. It is a medium-sized bat compared to other South American myotis.

== Taxonomy ==
The riparian myotis was originally described as a subspecies of velvety myotis in 1960. In 1973, it was raised to the species level.

== Description ==
The riparian myotis has long, woolly fur. The dorsal fur can vary geographically from a reddish to a blackish tinge. Individuals in the south tend to have a darker dorsal region, and individuals in the north tend to have a reddish dorsal region. The dorsal hairs are unicolor and the plagiopatagium is broadly attached to the foot at the base of the toes. The ears are short compared to the eyes and nostrils. The tragus is pointed and curves slightly outward. The ventral hairs are bicolored, with a dark-brown base and yellowish tips.

== Range and habitat ==
The riparian myotis is distributed widely throughout the neotropical region, and occurs from Honduras southward into Paraguay, northern Argentina and Uruguay. It can be found in rainforests, savannas, and open habitats throughout this region. It is most commonly seen from sea level to 2,000 meters above sea level. It has been seen in grasslands as well as agricultural fields.

The riparian myotis tends to prefer primary forests and preserved habitats. They have been observed roosting under tree bark and caves. They have been observed co-roosting with black myotis, Silver-tipped myotis, and Velvety free-tailed bat. They can form colonies of up to 50 individuals.
