= Schwartz's myotis =

Schwartz's Myotis

Conservation status
- Near Threatened (IUCN 3.1)

Scientific classification
- Kingdom: Animalia
- Phylum: Chordata
- Class: Mammalia
- Order: Chiroptera
- Family: Vespertilionidae
- Genus: Myotis
- Species: M. martiniquensis

Binomial name
- Myotis martiniquensis LaVal, 1973
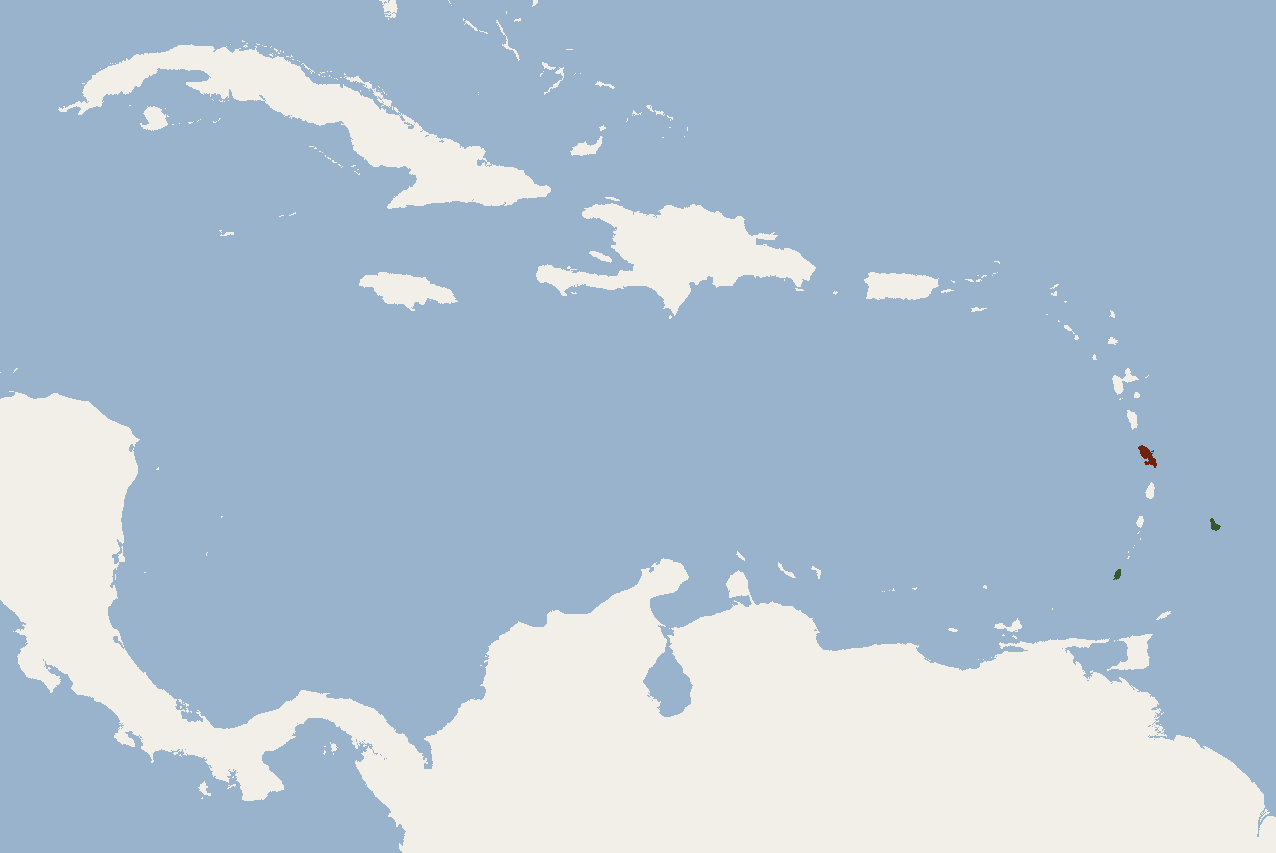

Species of bat

Schwartz's myotis (Myotis martiniquensis) is a species of vesper bat. It is found in Barbados and Martinique.
