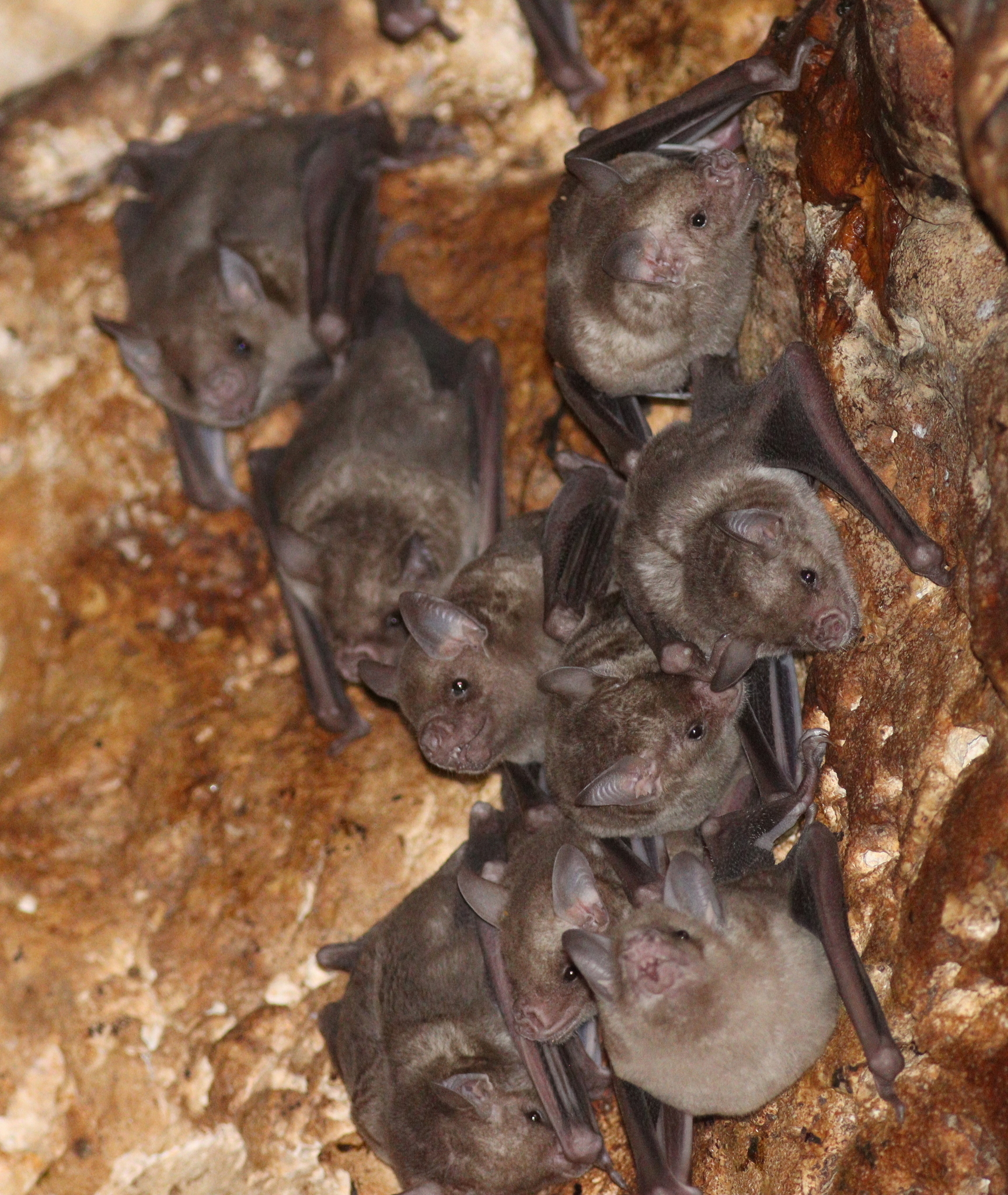

Conservation status
- Least Concern (IUCN 3.1)

Scientific classification
- Kingdom: Animalia
- Phylum: Chordata
- Class: Mammalia
- Order: Chiroptera
- Family: Phyllostomidae
- Genus: Brachyphylla
- Species: B. nana

Binomial name
- Brachyphylla nana Miller, 1902
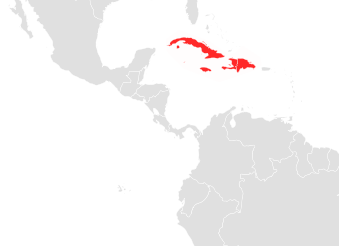
- Cuban fruit-eating bat range

Synonyms
- Brachyphylla pumilia Miller, 1902

= Cuban fruit-eating bat =

Species of bat

The Cuban fruit-eating bat (Brachyphylla nana) is a species of bat in the family Phyllostomidae found in the Cayman Islands, Cuba, and Hispaniola (both the Dominican Republic and Haiti).It has been extirpated from the Bahamas and Jamaica.
