= Curacao myotis =

Conservation status
- Least Concern (IUCN 3.1)

Scientific classification
- Kingdom: Animalia
- Phylum: Chordata
- Class: Mammalia
- Order: Chiroptera
- Family: Vespertilionidae
- Genus: Myotis
- Species: M. nesopolus

Binomial name
- Myotis nesopolus Miller, 1900
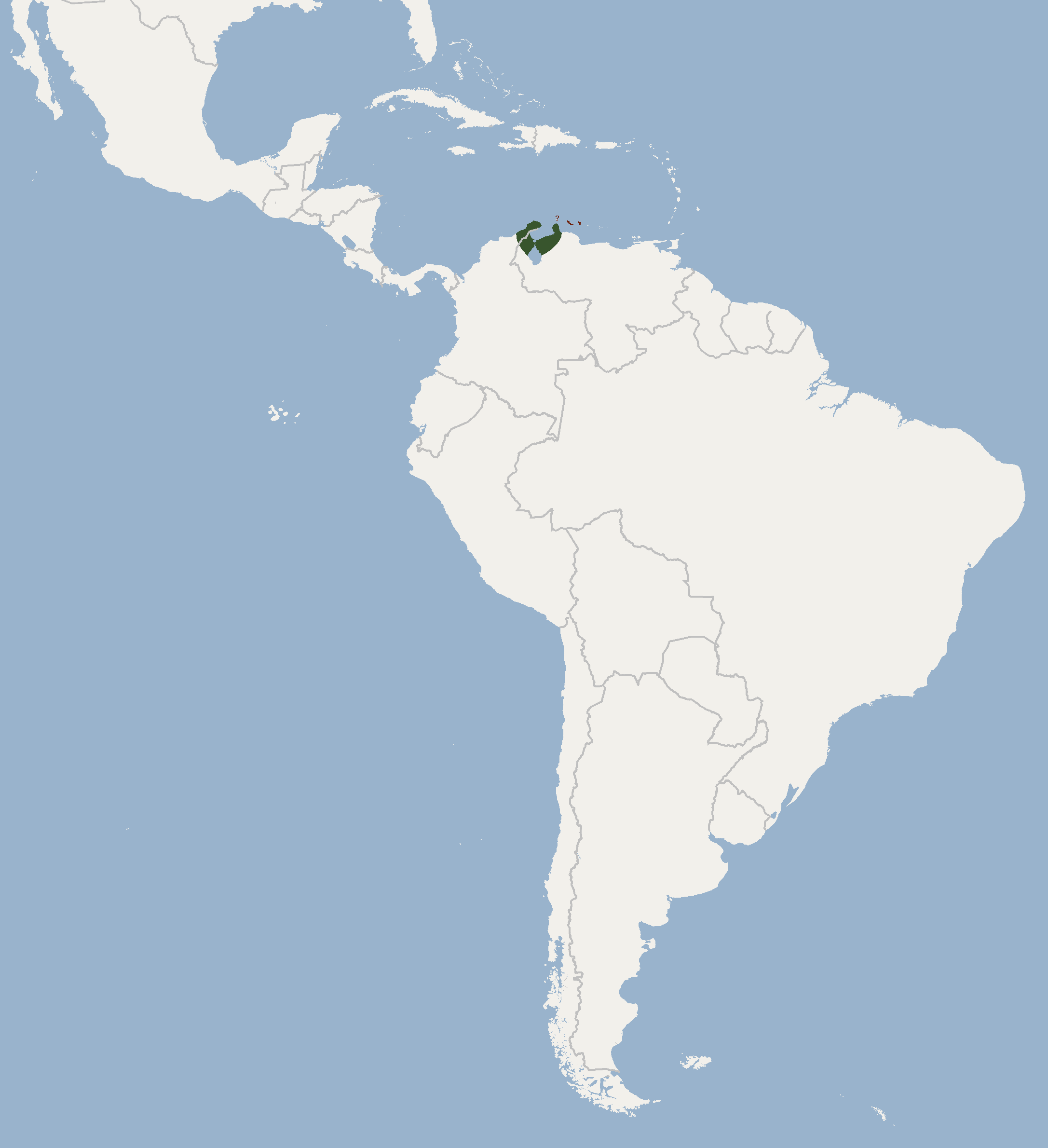

Species of mammal

The Curacao myotis (Myotis nesopolus) is a species of vesper bat (family Vespertilionidae). It is found in Bonaire (Netherlands), Colombia, Curaçao and Venezuela.
