= Sooty mustached bat =

Conservation status
- Least Concern (IUCN 3.1)

Scientific classification
- Kingdom: Animalia
- Phylum: Chordata
- Class: Mammalia
- Order: Chiroptera
- Family: Mormoopidae
- Genus: Pteronotus
- Species: P. quadridens

Binomial name
- Pteronotus quadridens (Gundlach, 1840)

Subspecies
- P. q. quadridens P. q. fuliginosus

Synonyms
- Lobostoma quadridens Gundlach, 1840; Chilonycteris fuliginosa Gray, 1843

Species of mammal

The sooty mustached bat (Pteronotus quadridens) is a species of bat in the family Mormoopidae. It is found in throughout the Greater Antilles, in Cuba, Hispaniola (the Dominican Republic and Haiti), Jamaica, and Puerto Rico.

== Description ==
The sooty mustached bat is the smallest species in the genus Pteronotus. Color phases in this bat are indicators of age differences or bleaching due to high concentrations of ammonia in the roost. As a result, color ranges from grayish brown to yellowish brown with some individuals reaching an orange-brown phase. The body is completely covered in fur except for the wings and tail membrane. The length of mandible is 8–9 millimetres (0.31–0.35 in) and their forearm is less than 41 millimetres (1.6 in) in length. The margin above nostril is lobulated and slightly convex.

=== Mating and reproduction ===
Sooty mustached bats are monestrous and uniparous most of the time with twinning rarely occurring. Based on the testicular size, mating begins in January and most females are pregnant in May. The pregnant female undergoes an increase in body mass of 38%. The largest embryo reported weighed 1.8 grams (0.063 oz), or 30.2% of the female's body mass. Throughout the breeding season, either males or females might disappear completely into caves. However, there is a marked shift in adult sex ratio favoring females. This suggests sexual segregation during the maternity period.

== Ecology ==
Sooty mustached bats roost exclusively in caves. They are one of the most common bats in Cuba and Puerto Rico. All currently known fossils are believed to be from late Pleistocene or Holocene epochs. Their ancestors are also expected to have originated on the Central American mainland.

The sooty mustached bat is an insectivorous bat feeding almost exclusively on flying insects. They start foraging approximately 10 minutes before sunset and continue to do so overnight. Almost all foraging is done in flight.

There are two respective patterns of echolocation calls in the field. First they call with quasi-constant frequency at 81–84 kHz, followed by a downward, frequency-modulated (FM) call. When the bats are flying in confined spaces, the call duration will be shorter and the bandwidth higher than the ones emitted during the search calls in the field.

Sooty mustached bats are susceptible to predation by diurnal birds since they are the first to leave just after the sunsets. American kestrels, red-tailed hawks, merlins, American barn owls, and possibly feral cats, Puerto Rican boas and Cuban boas are among a few of the sooty mustached bat's predators.
