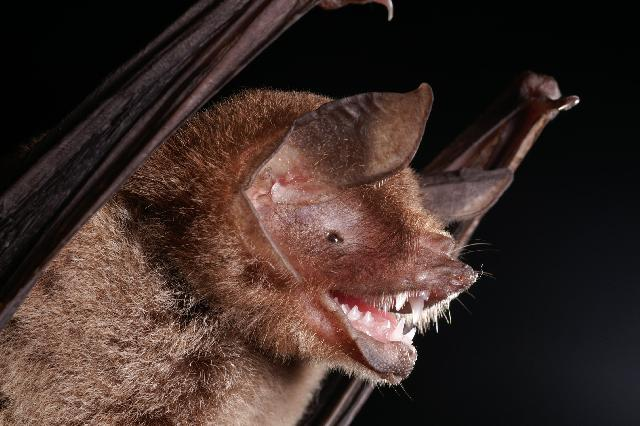
- Pteronotus parnellii

Scientific classification
- Kingdom: Animalia
- Phylum: Chordata
- Class: Mammalia
- Order: Chiroptera
- Family: Mormoopidae
- Genus: Pteronotus; Gray, 1838

Type species
- Pteronotus davyi Gray, 1838

Species
- Pteronotus alitonus Pteronotus davyi Pteronotus gymnonotus Pteronotus macleayii Pteronotus paraguanensis Pteronotus parnellii Pteronotus personatus †Pteronotus pristinus Pteronotus quadridens
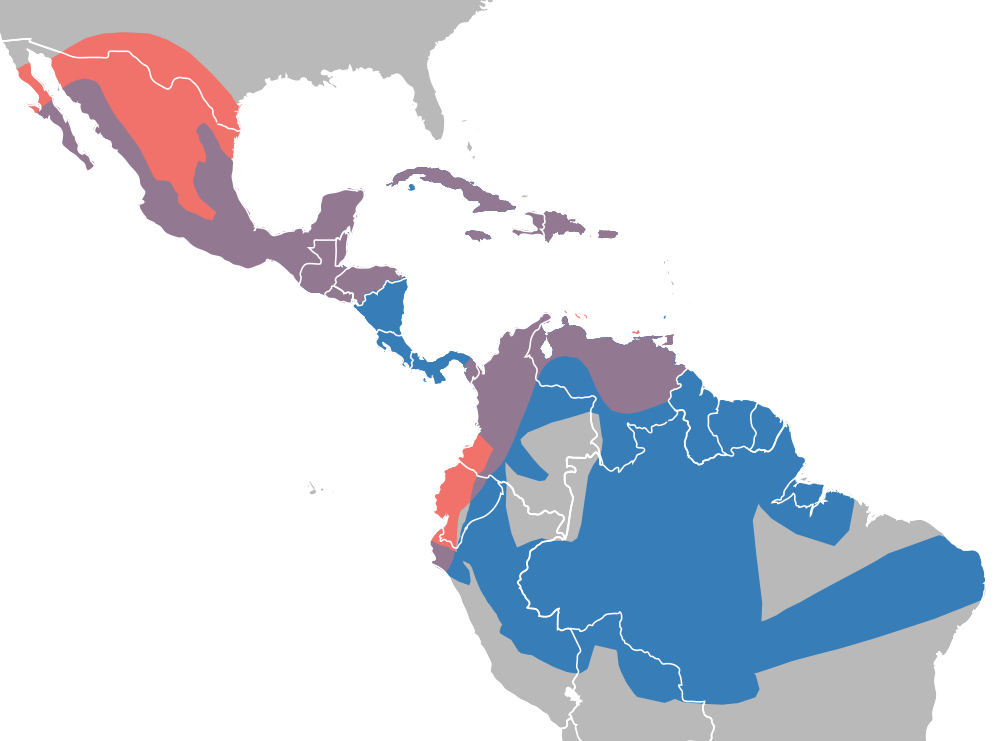
- Mormoopidae distribution Pteronotus in blue

= Pteronotus =

Genus of bats

Pteronotus is a genus of bats. Eight extant species have been recognized, as well as one relatively recently extinct species.
