= List of natalids =

Species in mammal family Natalidae

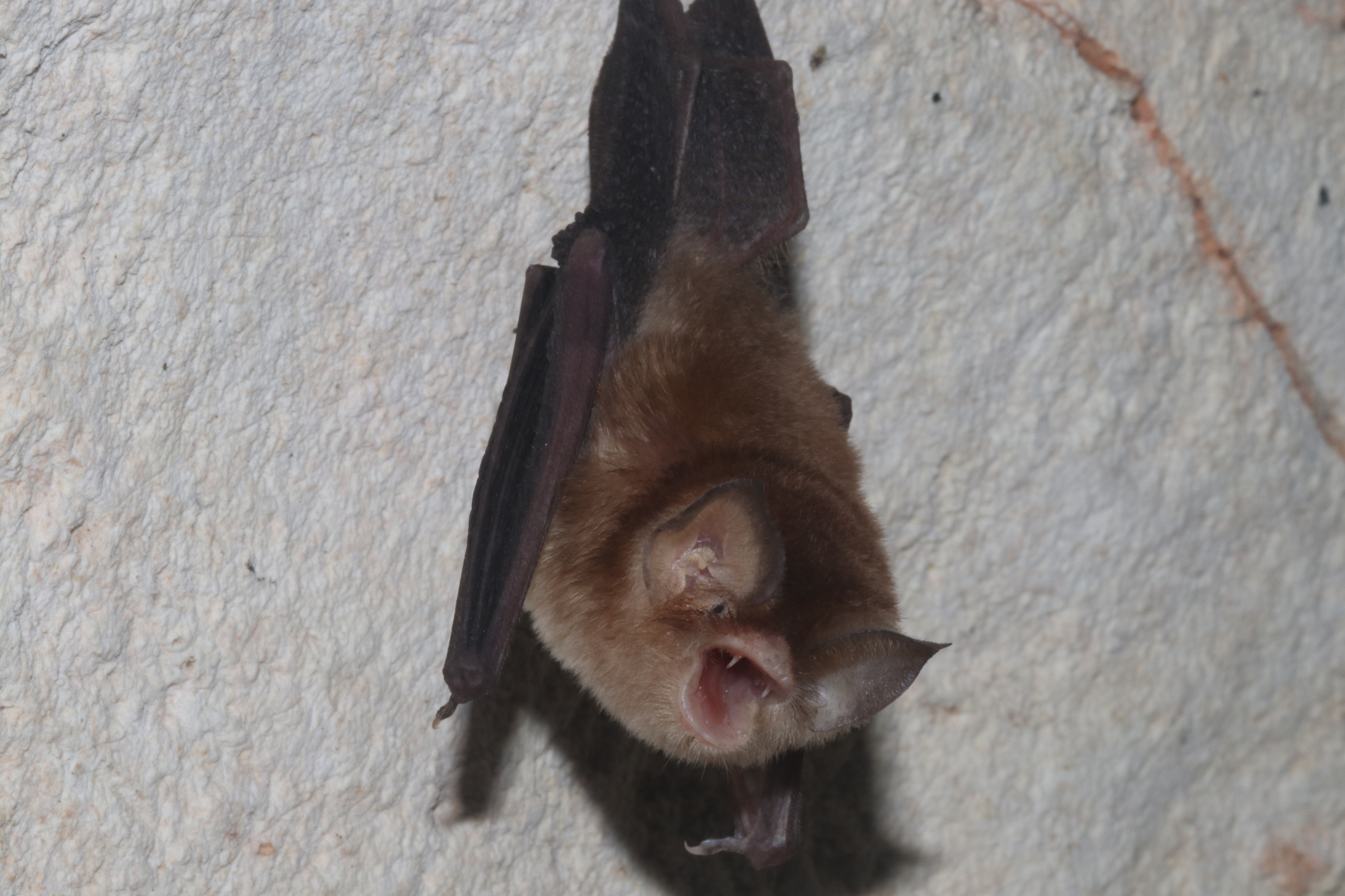
Mexican greater funnel-eared bat (Natalus mexicanus)

Natalidae is one of the twenty families of bats in the mammalian order Chiroptera and part of the microbat suborder. Members of this family are called natalids or funnel-eared bats. They are found in South America, Central America, and the Caribbean, in forests and caves. The majority of species in the family do not have size estimates, though those that do range in size from the Mexican greater funnel-eared bat, at 3 cm (1 in) plus a 4 cm (2 in) tail, to the Jamaican greater funnel-eared bat, at 6 cm (2 in) plus a 6 cm (2 in) tail. Like all bats, natalids are capable of true and sustained flight, and have forearm lengths ranging from 3 cm (1 in) to 5 cm (2 in). They are all insectivorous. No natalids have population estimates, though the Jamaican greater funnel-eared bat is categorized as critically endangered.

The eleven extant species of Natalidae are divided into three genera: Chilonatalus, with three species; Natalus, with seven species; and Nyctiellus, with a single species. A few extinct prehistoric natalid species have been discovered, though due to ongoing research and discoveries the exact number and categorization is not fixed.

== Conventions ==
IUCN Red List categories
Conservation status
- EX: Extinct (0 species)
- EW: Extinct in the wild (0 species)
- CR: Critically endangered (1 species)
- EN: Endangered (0 species)
- VU: Vulnerable (2 species)
- NT: Near threatened (3 species)
- LC: Least concern (4 species)

Other categories
- DD: Data deficient (1 species)
- NE: Not evaluated (0 species)

The author citation for the species or genus is given after the scientific name; parentheses around the author citation indicate that this was not the original taxonomic placement. Conservation status codes listed follow the International Union for Conservation of Nature (IUCN) Red List of Threatened Species. Range maps are provided wherever possible; if a range map is not available, a description of the natalid's range is provided. Ranges are based on the IUCN Red List for that species unless otherwise noted.

== Classification ==
Natalidae is a family consisting of eleven extant species in three genera: Chilonatalus, Natalus, and Nyctiellus.

Family Natalidae

- Genus Chilonatalus (lesser funnel-eared bats): three species
- Genus Natalus (greater funnel-eared bats): seven species
- Genus Nyctiellus (Gervais's funnel-eared bat): one species

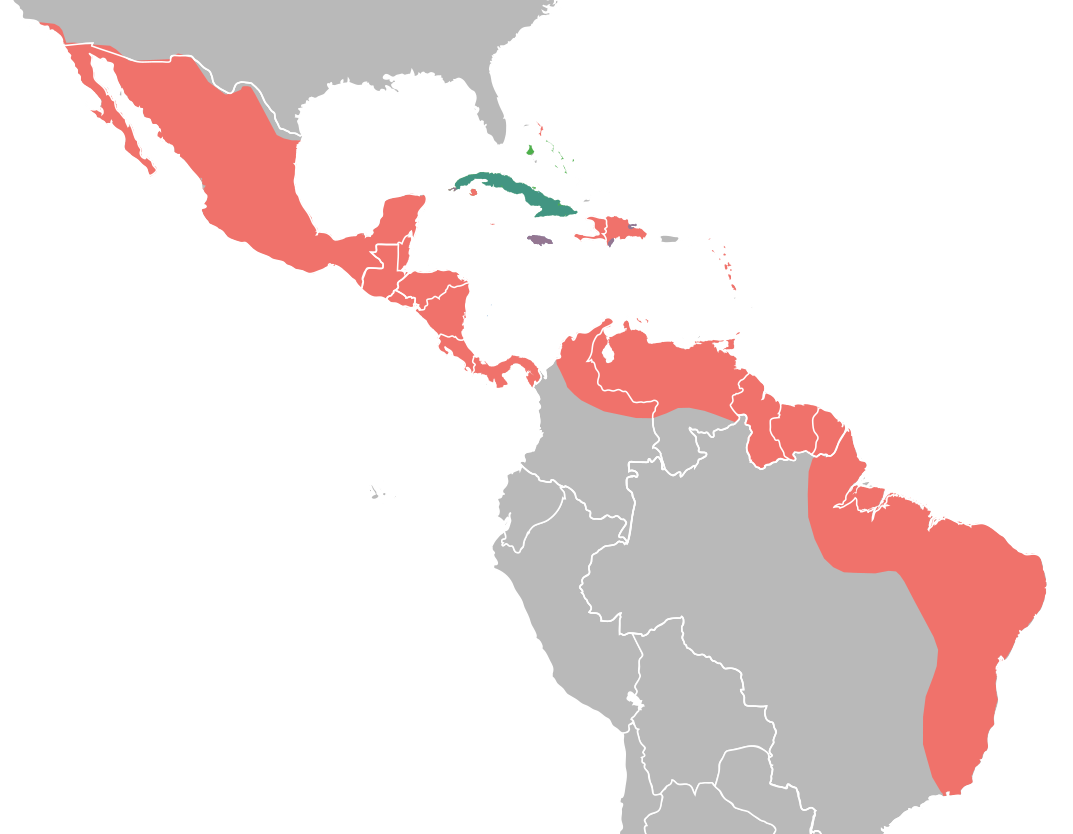
Natalidae distribution

== Natalids ==
The following classification is based on the taxonomy described by the reference work Mammal Species of the World (2005), with augmentation by generally accepted proposals made since using molecular phylogenetic analysis, as supported by both the IUCN SSC Bat Specialist Group and the American Society of Mammalogists.

Genus Chilonatalus – Miller, 1898 – three species
| Common name | Scientific name and subspecies | Range | Size and ecology | IUCN status and estimated population |
|---|---|---|---|---|
| Bahaman funnel-eared bat | C. tumidifrons Miller, 1903 | The Bahamas | Size: Unknown length 3–4 cm (1–2 in) forearm length Habitat: Forest and caves | NT Unknown |
| Cuban funnel-eared bat | C. micropus (Dobson, 1880) Two subspecies: C. m. brevimanus; C. m. micropus | Jamaica and Dominican Republic | Size: Unknown length 3–4 cm (1–2 in) forearm length Habitat: Caves | VU Unknown |
| Cuban lesser funnel-eared bat | C. macer Miller, 1914 | Cuba | Size: Unknown length 3–4 cm (1–2 in) forearm length Habitat: Forest | DD Unknown |

Genus Natalus – Gray, 1838 – seven species
| Common name | Scientific name and subspecies | Range | Size and ecology | IUCN status and estimated population |
|---|---|---|---|---|
| Brazilian funnel-eared bat | N. macrourus (Gervais, 1856) | Eastern South America | Size: Unknown length 3–4 cm (1–2 in) forearm length Habitat: Caves | NT Unknown |
| Cuban greater funnel-eared bat | N. primus (Anthony, 1919) | Cuba | Size: Unknown length 3–4 cm (1–2 in) forearm length Habitat: Caves | VU Unknown |
| Hispaniolan greater funnel-eared bat | N. major (Miller, 1902) | Island of Hispaniola | Size: Unknown length 4–5 cm (2 in) forearm length Habitat: Forest and caves | NT Unknown |
| Jamaican greater funnel-eared bat | N. jamaicensis (Goodwin, 1959) | Jamaica | Size: 5–6 cm (2 in) long, plus 5–6 cm (2 in) tail 4–5 cm (2 in) forearm length Habitat: Caves | CR Unknown |
| Mexican funnel-eared bat | N. stramineus Gray, 1838 Five subspecies: N. s. espiritosantensis; N. s. natalensis; N. s. saturatus; N. s. stramineus (Lesser Antillean funnel-eared bat); N. s. tronchonii | Eastern Caribbean | Size: Unknown length 3–5 cm (1–2 in) forearm length Habitat: Forest and caves | LC Unknown |
| Mexican greater funnel-eared bat | N. mexicanus Miller, 1902 | Central America | Size: 3–5 cm (1–2 in) long, plus 4–6 cm (2 in) tail 3–5 cm (1–2 in) forearm length Habitat: Forest and caves | LC Unknown |
| Trinidadian funnel-eared bat | N. tumidirostris Miller, 1900 Three subspecies: N. t. continentis; N. t. haymani; N. t. tumidirostris | Northern South America and Southern Caribbean | Size: Unknown length 3–5 cm (1–2 in) forearm length Habitat: Forest and caves | LC Unknown |

Genus Nyctiellus – Gervais, 1855 – one species
| Common name | Scientific name and subspecies | Range | Size and ecology | IUCN status and estimated population |
|---|---|---|---|---|
| Gervais's funnel-eared bat | N. lepidus Gervais, 1837 | Cuba and The Bahamas | Size: Unknown length 2–4 cm (1–2 in) forearm length Habitat: Forest and caves | LC Unknown |

== Sources ==
- Chernasky, Amy; Motis, Anna; Burgin, Connor, eds. (2023). All the Mammals of the World. Lynx Nature Books. ISBN 978-84-16728-66-4.
- Simmons, Nancy B. (2005). Wilson, Don E.; Reeder, DeeAnn M. (eds.). Mammal Species of the World. Vol. 1 (3rd ed.). Johns Hopkins University Press. ISBN 978-0-8018-8221-0.
- Nowak, Ronald M. (1994). Walker's Bats of the World. Johns Hopkins University Press. ISBN 978-0-8018-4986-2.
