= Dog-faced bat =

Dog-faced bat may refer to various species of New World bats in the Molossidae family:

- In the genus Cynomops:
  - Cinnamon dog-faced bat (C. abrasus)
  - Freeman's dog-faced bat (C. freemani)
  - Greenhall's dog-faced bat (C. greenhalli)
  - Mexican dog-faced bat (C. mexicanus)
  - Miller's dog-faced bat (C. milleri)
  - Southern dog-faced bat (C. planirostris)
- Other bat species of family Molossidae:
  - Mato Grosso dog-faced bat (Neoplatymops mattogrossensis, formerly Molossops mattogrossensis)
  - Equatorial dog-faced bat (Cabreramops aequatorianus, formerly Molossops aequatorianus)
  - Dwarf dog-faced bat (Molossops temminckii)
  - Rufous dog-faced bat (Molossops neglectus)
