= List of mammals of the Bahamas =

This is a list of the mammal species recorded in the Bahamas. Of the mammal species in the Bahamas, two are endangered, three are vulnerable, and one is considered to be extinct.

The following tags are used to highlight each species' conservation status as assessed by the International Union for Conservation of Nature:

EX	Extinct	No reasonable doubt that the last individual has died.
EW	Extinct in the wild	Known only to survive in captivity or as a naturalized population well outside its previous range.
CR	Critically endangered	The species is in imminent risk of extinction in the wild.
EN	Endangered	The species is facing an extremely high risk of extinction in the wild.
VU	Vulnerable	The species is facing a high risk of extinction in the wild.
NT	Near threatened	The species does not meet any of the criteria that would categorise it as risking extinction but it is likely to do so in the future.
LC	Least concern	There are no current identifiable risks to the species.
DD	Data deficient	There is inadequate information to make an assessment of the risks to this species.

== Order: Sirenia (manatees and dugongs) ==
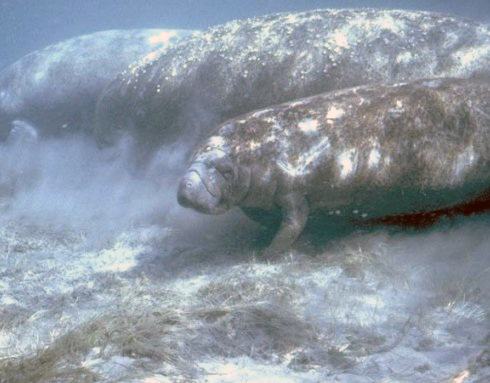
West Indian manatees

Sirenia is an order of fully aquatic, herbivorous mammals that inhabit rivers, estuaries, coastal marine waters, swamps, and marine wetlands. All four species are endangered.

- Family: Trichechidae
  - Genus: Trichechus
    - West Indian manatee, T. manatus VU

== Order: Rodentia (rodents) ==
Rodents make up the largest order of mammals, with over 40% of mammalian species. They have two incisors in the upper and lower jaw which grow continually and must be kept short by gnawing. Most rodents are small though the capybara can weigh up to 45 kg (100 lb).

- Suborder: Hystricomorpha
  - Family: Capromyidae
    - Subfamily: Capromyinae
      - Genus: Geocapromys
        - Bahamian hutia, G. ingrahami VU
  - Family: Muridae
    - Subfamily: Murinae
      - Genus: Rattus
        - Black rat, R. rattus LC introduced
        - Brown rat, R. norvegicus LC introduced
      - Genus: Mus
        - House mouse, M. musculus LC introduced

== Order: Chiroptera (bats) ==
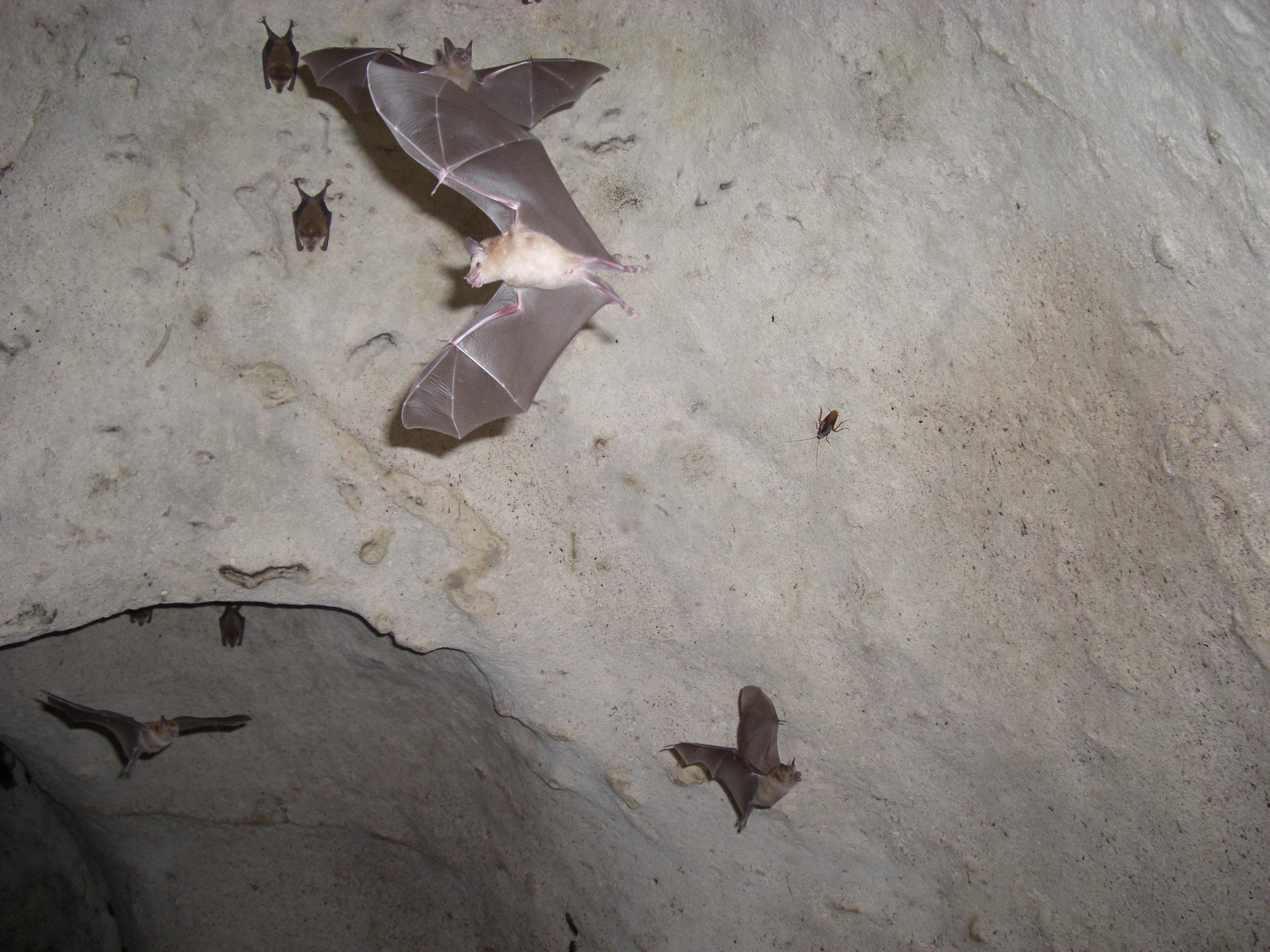
Bahamian bats

The bats' most distinguishing feature is that their forelimbs are developed as wings, making them the only mammals capable of flight. Bat species account for about 20% of all mammals.

- Family: Noctilionidae
  - Genus: Noctilio
    - Greater bulldog bat, N. leporinus LC
- Family: Vespertilionidae
  - Subfamily: Vespertilioninae
    - Genus: Eptesicus
      - Big brown bat, E. fuscus LC
    - Genus: Lasiurus
      - Minor red bat, L. minor VU
- Family: Molossidae
  - Genus: Tadarida
    - Mexican free-tailed bat, T. brasiliensis LC
- Family: Phyllostomidae
  - Subfamily: Phyllostominae
    - Genus: Macrotus
      - Waterhouse's leaf-nosed bat, M. waterhousii LC
  - Subfamily: Brachyphyllinae
    - Genus: Brachyphylla
      - Cuban fruit-eating bat, B. nana LC extirpated
  - Subfamily: Phyllonycterinae
    - Genus: Erophylla
      - Buffy flower bat, E. sezekorni LC
  - Subfamily: Glossophaginae
    - Genus: Monophyllus
      - Leach's single leaf bat, M. redmani LC
  - Subfamily: Stenodermatinae
    - Genus: Artibeus
      - Jamaican fruit bat, A. jamaicensis LC
- Family: Natalidae
  - Genus: Chilonatalus
    - Bahaman funnel-eared bat, C. tumidifrons NT
  - Genus: Nyctiellus
    - Gervais's funnel-eared bat, N. lepidus LC

== Order: Cetacea (whales) ==
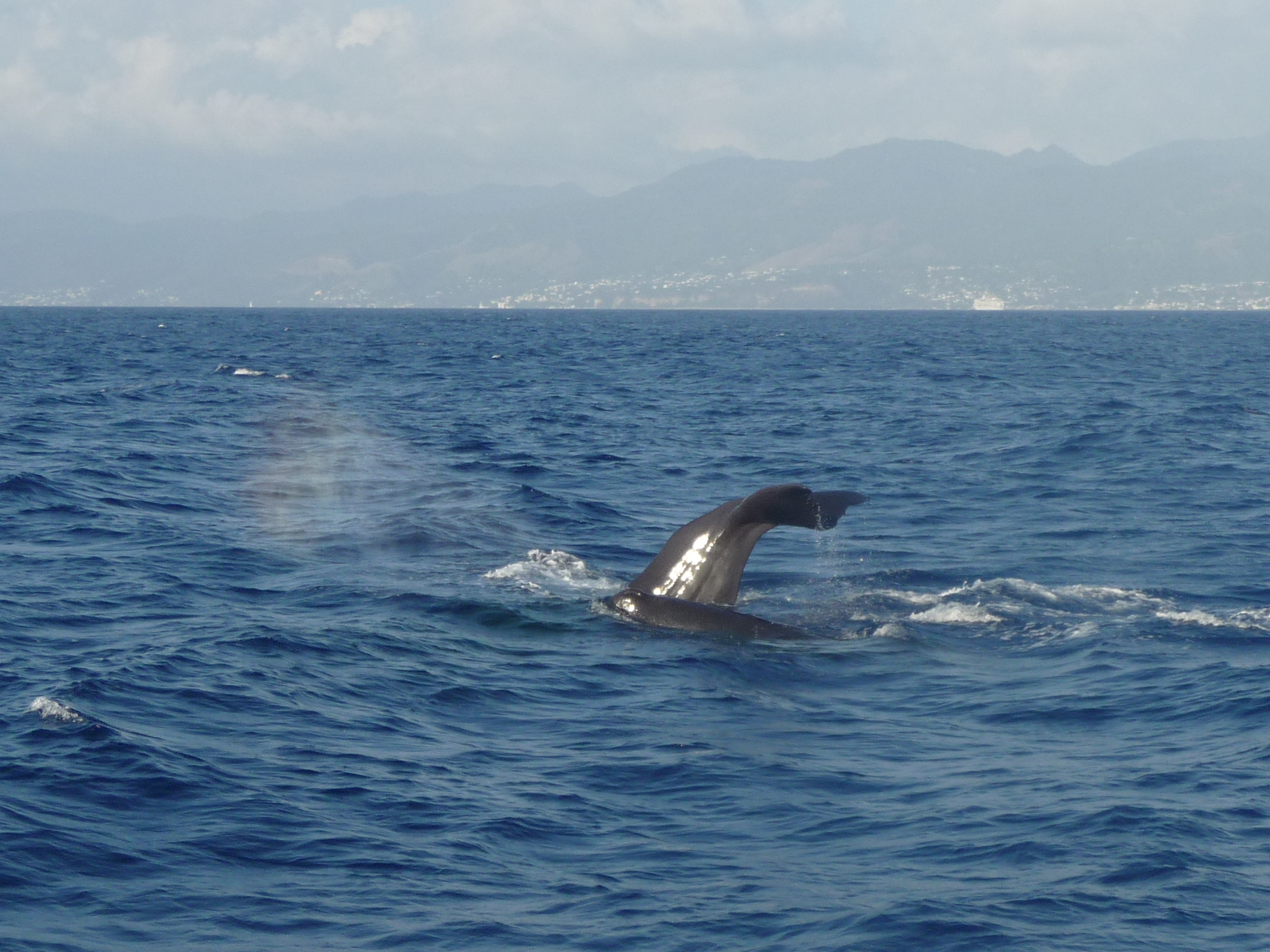
Sperm whale

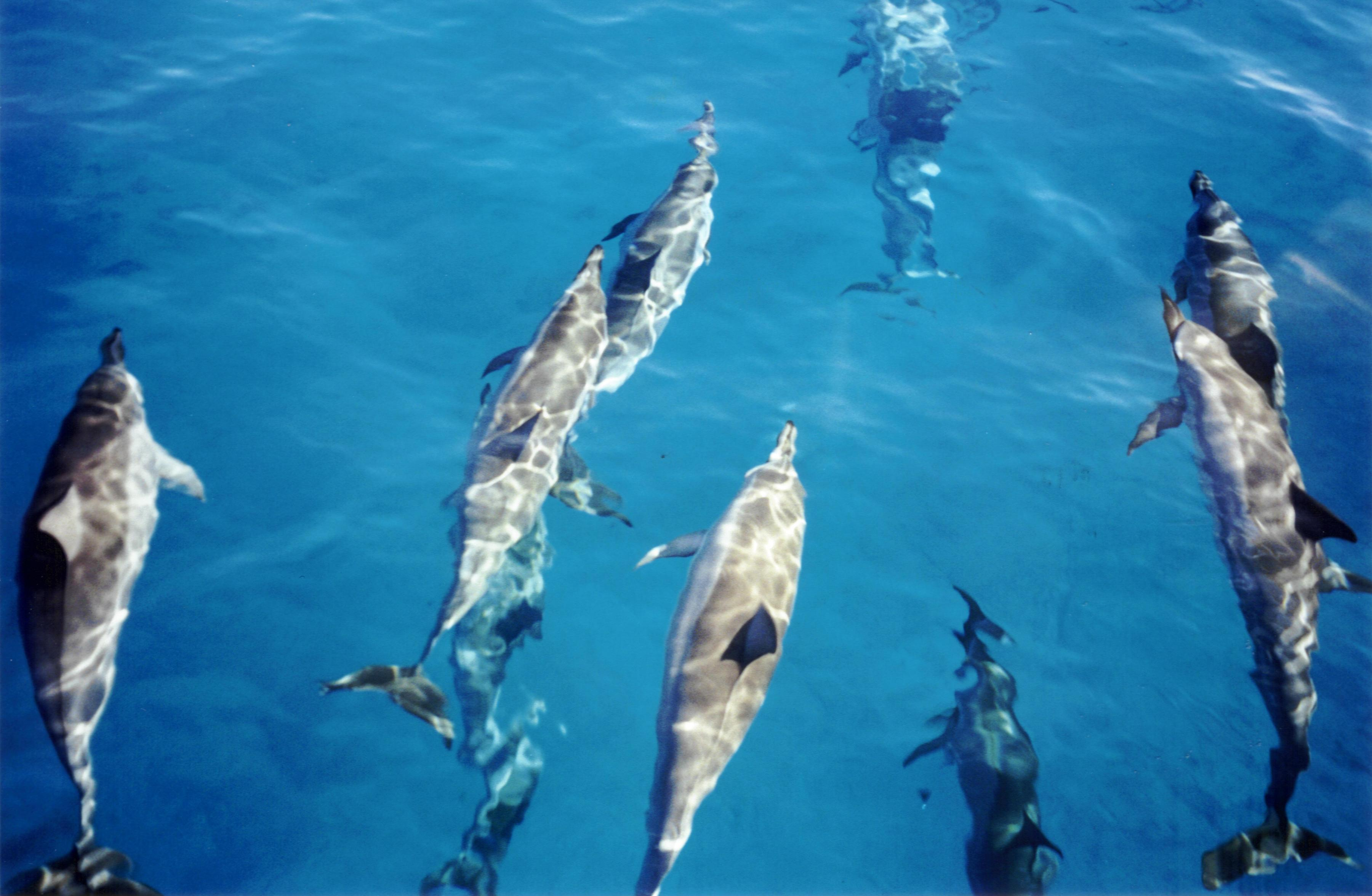
Spinner dolphins

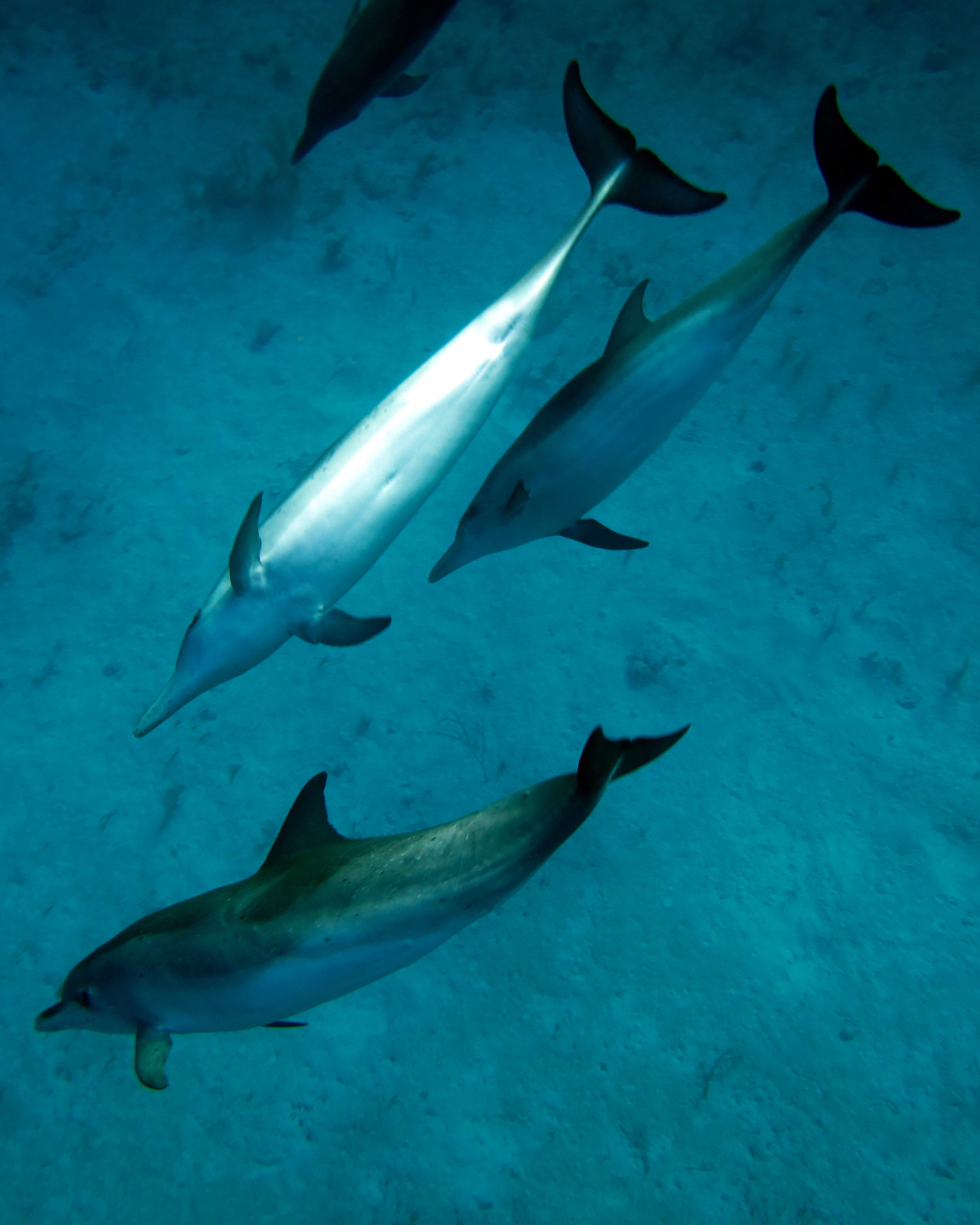
Atlantic spotted dolphin

The order Cetacea includes whales, dolphins and porpoises. They are the mammals most fully adapted to aquatic life with a spindle-shaped nearly hairless body, protected by a thick layer of blubber, and forelimbs and tail modified to provide propulsion underwater.

- Suborder: Mysticeti
  - Family: Balaenopteridae (baleen whales)
    - Genus: Eubalaena
      - North Atlantic right whale, E. glacialis EN
    - Genus: Balaenoptera
      - Common minke whale, Balaenoptera acutorostrata
      - Sei whale, Balaenoptera borealis
      - Bryde's whale, Balaenoptera brydei
      - Blue whale, Balaenoptera musculus
      - Fin whale, Balaenoptera physalus
    - Genus: Megaptera
      - Humpback whale, Megaptera novaeangliae
- Suborder: Odontoceti
  - Superfamily: Platanistoidea
    - Family: Delphinidae (marine dolphins)
      - Genus: Delphinus
        - Short-beaked common dolphin, Delphinus delphis DD
      - Genus: Feresa
        - Pygmy killer whale, Feresa attenuata DD
      - Genus: Globicephala
        - Short-finned pilot whale, Globicephala macrorhyncus DD
      - Genus: Lagenodelphis
        - Fraser's dolphin, Lagenodelphis hosei DD
      - Genus: Grampus
        - Risso's dolphin, Grampus griseus DD
      - Genus: Orcinus
        - Killer whale, Orcinus orca DD
      - Genus: Peponocephala
        - Melon-headed whale, Peponocephala electra DD
      - Genus: Pseudorca
        - False killer whale, Pseudorca crassidens DD
      - Genus: Stenella
        - Pantropical spotted dolphin, Stenella attenuata DD
        - Clymene dolphin, Stenella clymene DD
        - Striped dolphin, Stenella coeruleoalba DD
        - Atlantic spotted dolphin, Stenella frontalis DD
        - Spinner dolphin, Stenella longirostris DD
      - Genus: Steno
        - Rough-toothed dolphin, Steno bredanensis DD
      - Genus: Tursiops
        - Common bottlenose dolphin, Tursiops truncatus
    - Family: Physeteridae (sperm whales)
      - Genus: Physeter
        - Sperm whale, Physeter catodon DD
    - Family: Kogiidae (dwarf sperm whales)
      - Genus: Kogia
        - Pygmy sperm whale, Kogia breviceps DD
        - Dwarf sperm whale, Kogia sima DD
  - Superfamily Ziphioidea
    - Family: Ziphidae (beaked whales)
      - Genus: Mesoplodon
        - Gervais' beaked whale, Mesoplodon europaeus DD
        - Blainville's beaked whale, Mesoplodon densirostris DD
        - True's beaked whale, Mesoplodon mirus DD
      - Genus: Ziphius
        - Cuvier's beaked whale, Ziphius cavirostris DD

== Order: Carnivora (carnivorans) ==
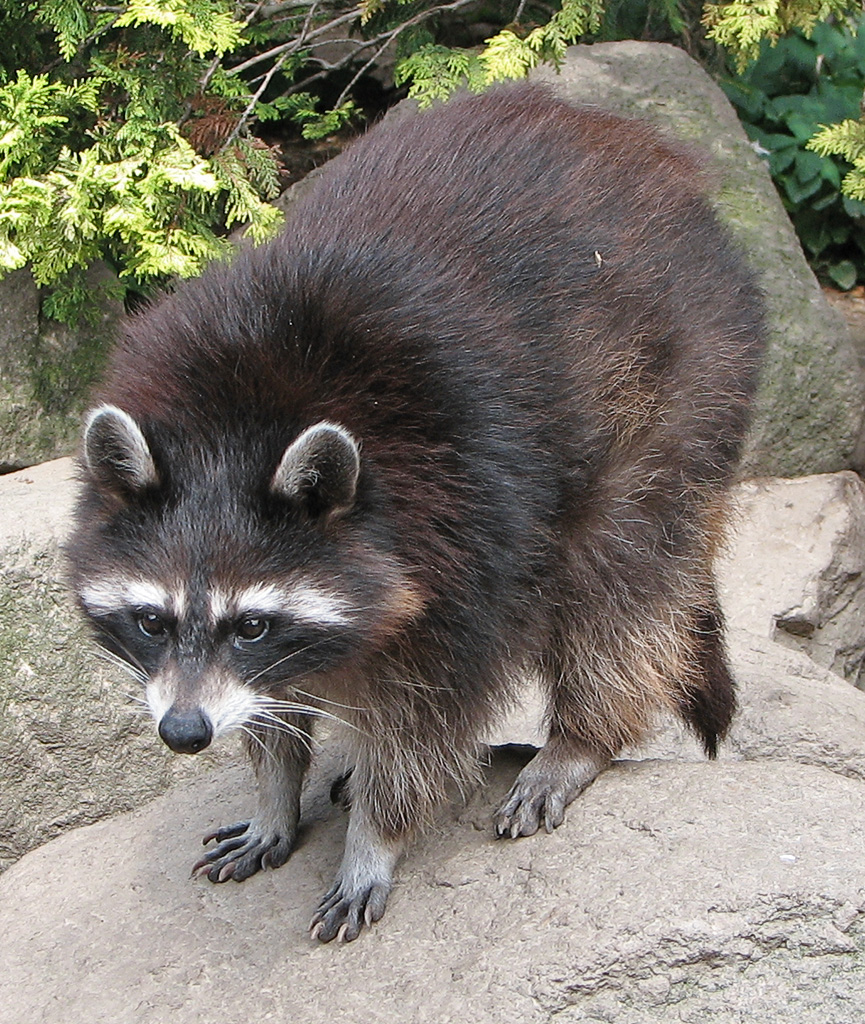
Common raccoon

There are over 260 species of carnivorans, the majority of which feed primarily on meat. They have a characteristic skull shape and dentition.

- Suborder: Caniformia
  - Family: Procyonidae (raccoons)
    - Genus: Procyon
      - Raccoon, P. lotor LC
        - Bahamian raccoon, P. l. maynardi
  - Family: Phocinae
    - Genus Cystophora
      - Hooded seal, C. cristata VU occasional visitor
    - Genus: Neomonachus
      - Caribbean monk seal, N. tropicalis EX

== See also ==
- List of chordate orders
- Lists of mammals by region
- List of prehistoric mammals
- Mammal classification
- List of mammals described in the 2000s
