= List of mammals of Saint Martin (island) =

This is a list of the mammal species recorded in Saint Martin. Of the mammals of Saint Martin, only bats are native. Apart from bats, many oceanic mammals, exotic mammals and domesticated species can be found within and around the island. Native rodents, such as the blunt-toothed giant hutia and oryzomyines, are known to extirpated from the island due to the impact of humans, where a few oryzomyines can be found around archeological sites.

== Table ==
The following tags are used to highlight each species' conservation status as assessed by the International Union for Conservation of Nature:

EX	Extinct	No reasonable doubt that the last individual has died.
EW	Extinct in the wild	Known only to survive in captivity or as a naturalized populations well outside its previous range.
CR	Critically endangered	The species is in imminent risk of extinction in the wild.
EN	Endangered	The species is facing an extremely high risk of extinction in the wild.
VU	Vulnerable	The species is facing a high risk of extinction in the wild.
NT	Near threatened	The species does not meet any of the criteria that would categorise it as risking extinction but it is likely to do so in the future.
LC	Least concern	There are no current identifiable risks to the species.
DD	Data deficient	There is inadequate information to make an assessment of the risks to this species.

Some species were assessed using an earlier set of criteria. Species assessed using this system have the following instead of near threatened and least concern categories:

LR/cd	Lower risk/conservation dependent	Species which were the focus of conservation programmes and may have moved into a higher risk category if that programme was discontinued.
LR/nt	Lower risk/near threatened	Species which are close to being classified as vulnerable but are not the subject of conservation programmes.
LR/lc	Lower risk/least concern	Species for which there are no identifiable risks.

== Subclass: Theria ==
=== Order: Sirenia (manatees and dugongs) ===
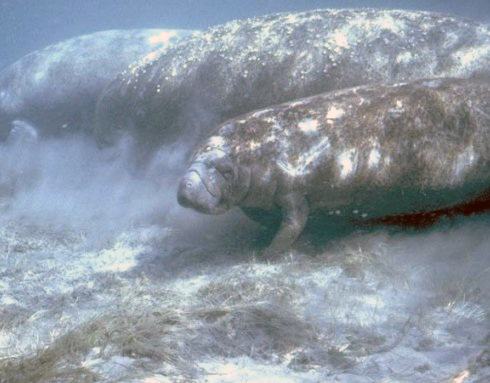
West Indian manatees

Sirenia is an order of fully aquatic, herbivorous mammals that inhabit rivers, estuaries, coastal marine waters, swamps, and marine wetlands. All four species are endangered.

- Family: Trichechidae
  - Genus: Trichechus
    - West Indian manatee, T. manatus VU extirpated

=== Order: Chiroptera (bats) ===
Bats comprise 20% of described mammals and are the only true-fliers among them. Saint Martin is home for seven bat species.

  - Family: Noctilionidae
    - Genus: Noctilio
      - Greater bulldog bat, Noctilio leporinus ssp. mastivus LR/lc
  - Family: Phyllostomidae
    - Subfamily: Glossophaginae
      - Genus: Monophyllus
        - Antillean fruit-eating bat, Brachyphylla cavernarum LC
      - Genus: Monophyllus
        - Insular single leaf bat, Monophyllus plethodon ssp. luciae LR/nt
    - Subfamily: Stenodermatinae
      - Genus: Ardops
        - Tree bat, Ardops nichollsi LR/nt
      - Genus: Artibeus
        - Jamaican fruit bat, Artibeus jamaicensis LR/lc
  - Family: Natalidae
    - Genus: Natalus
        - Mexican funnel-eared bat, Natalus stramineus ssp. stramineus LR/lc
  - Family: Molossidae
    - Genus: Tadarida
      - Mexican free-tailed bat, Tadarida brasiliensis ssp. antillularum LR/nt
      - Genus: Molossus
        - Velvety free-tailed bat, Molossus molossus ssp. molossus LR/lc

=== Order: Cetacea (whales) ===
The order Cetacea which includes whales, dolphins and porpoises, are the mammals most fully adapted to aquatic life which enable them to survive like fish in the water. They are armored with thick blubber, limbs evolved as fins and also with tail fin.

- Suborder: Mysticeti
  - Family: Balaenopteridae (baleen whales)
    - Genus: Balaenoptera
      - Common minke whale, Balaenoptera acutorostrata
      - Sei whale, Balaenoptera borealis
      - Bryde's whale, Balaenoptera brydei
      - Blue whale, Balaenoptera musculus
    - Genus: Megaptera
      - Humpback whale, Megaptera novaeangliae
- Suborder: Odontoceti
  - Superfamily: Platanistoidea
    - Family: Delphinidae (marine dolphins)
      - Genus: Delphinus
        - Short-beaked common dolphin, Delphinus delphis DD
      - Genus: Feresa
        - Pygmy killer whale, Feresa attenuata DD
      - Genus: Globicephala
        - Short-finned pilot whale, Globicephala macrorhyncus DD
      - Genus: Lagenodelphis
        - Fraser's dolphin, Lagenodelphis hosei DD
      - Genus: Grampus
        - Risso's dolphin, Grampus griseus DD
      - Genus: Orcinus
        - Killer whale, Orcinus orca DD
      - Genus: Peponocephala
        - Melon-headed whale, Peponocephala electra DD
      - Genus: Pseudorca
        - False killer whale, Pseudorca crassidens DD
      - Genus: Stenella
        - Pantropical spotted dolphin, Stenella attenuata DD
        - Clymene dolphin, Stenella clymene DD
        - Striped dolphin, Stenella coeruleoalba DD
        - Atlantic spotted dolphin, Stenella frontalis DD
        - Spinner dolphin, Stenella longirostris DD
      - Genus: Steno
        - Rough-toothed dolphin, Steno bredanensis DD
      - Genus: Tursiops
        - Common bottlenose dolphin, Tursiops truncatus
    - Family: Physeteridae (sperm whales)
      - Genus: Physeter
        - Sperm whale, Physeter catodon DD
    - Family: Kogiidae (dwarf sperm whales)
      - Genus: Kogia
        - Pygmy sperm whale, Kogia breviceps DD
        - Dwarf sperm whale, Kogia sima DD
  - Superfamily Ziphioidea
    - Family: Ziphidae (beaked whales)
      - Genus: Mesoplodon
        - Gervais' beaked whale, Mesoplodon europaeus DD)
      - Genus: Ziphius
        - Cuvier's beaked whale, Ziphius cavirostris DD

=== Order: Carnivora (carnivorans) ===
Well over 250 species of carnivorans, they fill up the top ranks of any food web, and helps to control the population of herbivores.

- Suborder: Pinnipedia
  - Family: Phocidae (earless seals)
    - Genus: Neomonachus
      - Caribbean monk seal, Neomonachus tropicalis EX

=== Order: Rodentia (rodents) ===
Rodents are the most successful mammals, comprising more than 40% of described mammal species. They are economically important animals, where most of them are pests and invasive species in human habitations.

- Family: Muridae (rats and mice)
  - Subfamily: Murinae
    - Genus: Rattus
      - Black rat, Rattus rattus LC introduced
    - Genus: Mus
      - House mouse, Mus musculus LC introduced

== See also ==
- List of chordate orders
- Lists of mammals by region
- List of prehistoric mammals
- Mammal classification
- List of mammals described in the 2000s
