= Chilonatalus macer =

Conservation status
- Data Deficient (IUCN 3.1)

Scientific classification
- Kingdom: Animalia
- Phylum: Chordata
- Class: Mammalia
- Order: Chiroptera
- Family: Natalidae
- Genus: Chilonatalus
- Species: C. macer

Binomial name
- Chilonatalus macer Miller, 1914

Species of bat

Chilonatalus macer is a species of bat endemic to Cuba.

== Taxonomy ==
Chilonatalus macer was described as a new species in 1914 by American zoologist Gerrit Smith Miller Jr. The holotype had been collected in Baracoa, Cuba by William Palmer in 1902. Prior to 2011, it was frequently included as a subspecies within the Cuban funnel-eared bat, Chilonatalus micropus. However, it is now most often regarded as a full species.

== Description ==
It has a short forearm length of 32.1–33.8 mm (1.26–1.33 in). Individuals weigh only 2–4 g (0.071–0.141 oz).

== Biology and ecology ==
Chilonatalus macer is insectivorous, consuming moths but also spiders. At any time, its stomach can hold up to 28.6% of its body weight. It is a colonial species, and forms aggregations in caves typically consisting of 30-50 individuals. In cool or dry caves, however, some individuals have been documented roosting solitarily.

== Range and habitat ==
Chilonatalus macer is found only in Cuba, where its range is the island of Cuba as well as the Isla de la Juventud. Fossil evidence supports that it was once found on the island of Grand Cayman as well. In Cuba, it has been documented at a range of elevations from 0–230 m (0–755 ft) above sea level. Its habitat includes mesic forest, though it has been documented in drier habitat as well.

It is nocturnal, roosting in sheltered places during the day such as humid caves.
