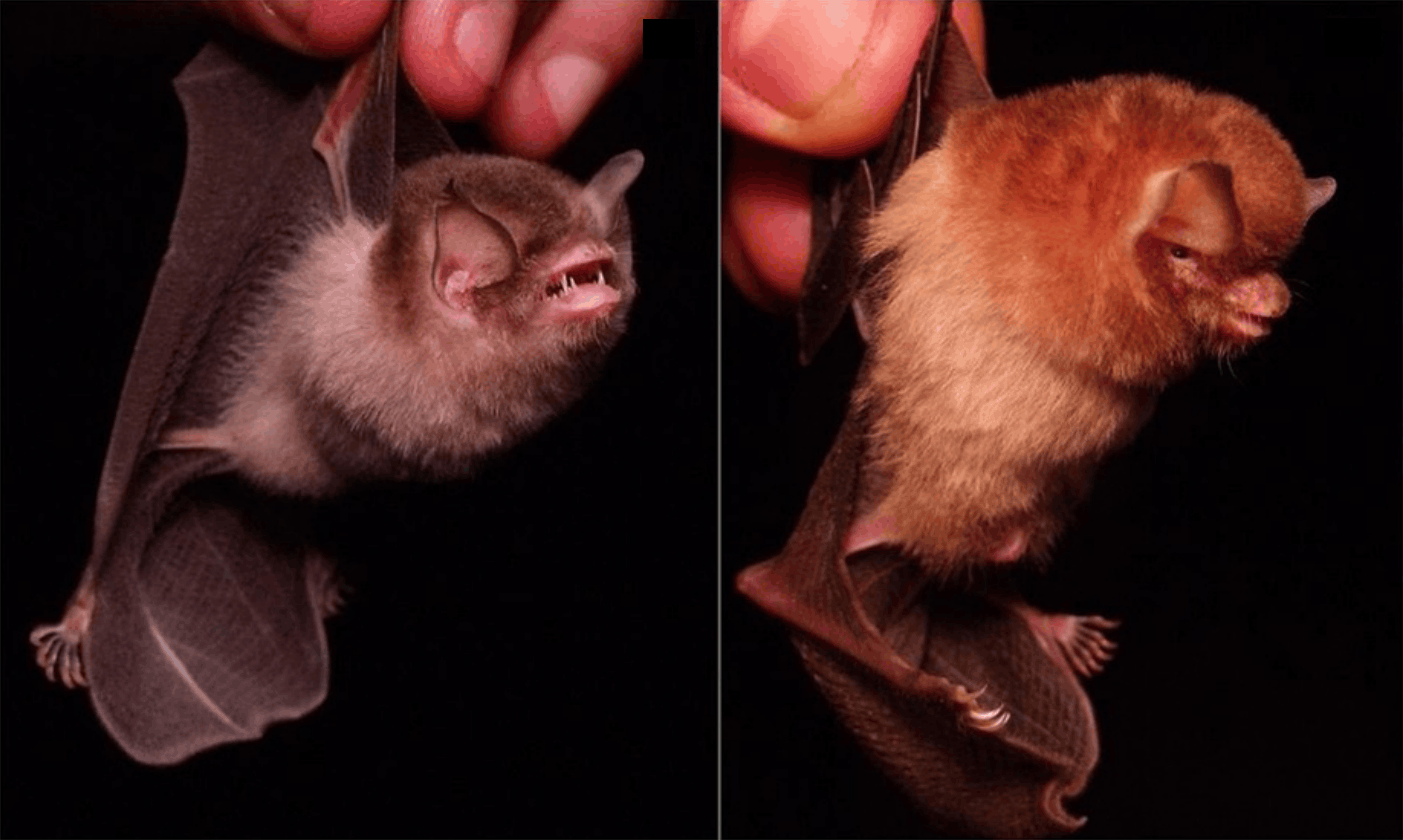
- Juvenile (left) and adult (right) Natalus macrourus

Conservation status
- Near Threatened (IUCN 3.1)

Scientific classification
- Kingdom: Animalia
- Phylum: Chordata
- Class: Mammalia
- Order: Chiroptera
- Family: Natalidae
- Genus: Natalus
- Species: N. macrourus

Binomial name
- Natalus macrourus (Gervais, 1856)

Synonyms
- Myotis espiritosantensis Ruschi, 1951; Natalus espiritosantensis (Ruschi, 1951); Natalus stramineus subsp. espiritosantensis (Ruschi, 1951); Natalus stramineus subsp. natalensis Goodwin, 1959; Spectrellum macrourum Gervais, 1856; Tadarida espiritosantensis (Ruschi, 1951)

= Brazilian funnel-eared bat =

Species of bat

The Brazilian funnel-eared bat (Natalus macrourus) is an insectivorous bat species found in eastern Brazil and Paraguay. It roosts in caves, which makes it vulnerable to disturbance of these scarce sites, and in particular, to extermination campaigns against cave-roosting bats carried out in Brazil to combat rabies.

It was formerly considered a subspecies of N. stramineus.

== Description ==
Physical characteristics include short maxillary toothrow length, deeply concave and deeply notched auricular pinna, small oval nostrils open ventrolaterally, unicolored abdominal fur, and bicolored fur with lighter bases on the back and sides. Fur is described as being yellow, orange, or white in color. The bats are small in size, weighing around 6 grams. They have small deep set eyes and a distinct beak-shaped nose due to the presence of a natalid organ, which secretes a substance used in intraspecific communication .

== Distribution and habitat ==
The Brazilian Funnel-eared bat has been documented in eastern Brazil, Bolivia, and Paraguay. They have the widest distribution of the family Natalidae.

Like many members of the family Natalidae, they are considered cave specialists, and seem to display a preference for areas with lower annual rainfall and daily temperature variation. Warm, humid caves are essential to the species, as pups are born almost entirely hairless, meaning the cave must be close to the body temperature of the pups (28° C - 40° C) for survival. They tend to live in colonies of 10-20 individuals, which makes them particularly difficult to locate due to the small size of the colony and of the bats themselves.

== Conservation ==
The IUCN Red List classifies the Brazilian funnel-eared bat as "near threatened," with the biggest threats to the species being habitat loss and degradation due to human disturbance. Habitat modeling suggests the species is likely to be reclassified as "vulnerable" in the near future, with models showing a 54% decrease in suitable habitat distribution. In addition, habitat range analysis also identifies that many of the remaining suitable habitat areas are in close vicinity of mining operations, which may also pose a threat to the species. Human persecution also plays a significant role in the decline of the species, due to anti-rabies extermination campaigns that have become popular throughout Brazil. Some researchers suggest that the remoteness and rarity of the species may save some populations from anthropogenic disturbances, though it is expected become extinct in a hefty part of its range if extermination campaigns continue.

Recent studies have revealed new populations of the species in northeastern Brazil, suggesting that these bats are more widespread than previously thought.

Taxonomic classification and genetics are essential to the preservation of the species, but currently very under researched. The Natalus macrourus karyotype was described for the first time in 2025. Genetic understanding of the species and individual populations is essential to making well-informed management decisions.
