= Mexican dog-faced bat =

Conservation status
- Least Concern (IUCN 3.1)

Scientific classification
- Kingdom: Animalia
- Phylum: Chordata
- Class: Mammalia
- Order: Chiroptera
- Family: Molossidae
- Genus: Cynomops
- Species: C. mexicanus

Binomial name
- Cynomops mexicanus Jones & Genoways, 1967

Synonyms
- Molossops greenhalli mexicanus Jones & Genoways, 1967; Cynomops greenhalli mexicanus Jones & Genoways, 1967

Species of bat

The Mexican dog-faced bat (Cynomops mexicanus) is a bat species of the family Molossidae from Central America. It is found from Nayarit in Mexico to Costa Rica at elevations up to 1500 m. It was formerly considered a subspecies of C. greenhalli. It roosts in deciduous and evergreen forest, and is usually found near small bodies of water.

== Taxonomy and etymology ==
- Cynomops
  - C. mexicanus
  - - - C. abrasus
      - C. greenhalli
    - - C. planirostris
      - C. paranus

Phylogeny of Cynomops

It was described as a subspecies of Greenhall's dog-faced bat (Cynomops greenhalli) in 1967 by Jones and Genoways. At the time, Greenhall's dog-faced bat was in the genus Molossops, so the Mexican dog-faced bat initially had the trinomen Molossops greenhalli mexicanus. When Cynomops was recognized as a valid genus rather than a subgenus of Molossops, Greenhall's dog-faced bat became part of the new genus. However, it wasn't until 2002 that the Mexican dog-faced bat was promoted to full species status. It is the most basal member of Cynomops. Its species name "mexicanus" is Latin meaning "from Mexico."

== Description ==
It is a relatively large free-tailed bat. Total length is 90–107 mm (3.5–4.2 in); forearms and tails are 34.6–36.8 mm (1.36–1.45 in) and 28–33 mm (1.1–1.3 in) long, respectively. It weighs 16.2–16.5 g (0.57–0.58 oz). Fur color is dark brown or reddish brown overall, but lighter on the stomach.

== Biology ==
It is nocturnal, and roosts in sheltered places during the day such as inside hollow trees.
