= Dogface =

Dogface may refer to:

== Biology ==
- Zerene, a genus of butterflies commonly known as the Dogfaces
  - Zerene cesonia, a butterfly in this genus commonly known as the Dogface or Southern Dogface
- Acrochordus, a family of snakes sometimes called Dogface Snakes
- Blackspotted puffer, a species of fish sometimes called Dogface Puffer, in family Tetraodontidae
- Narrow-lined puffer, a species of fish sometimes called Striped Dogface Puffer, also in family Tetraodontidae
- Dogface witch eel

== Other ==
- Dogface (military), US military term
- Aani, or Dog-faced Ape, ancient Egyptian term for baboon
- Dogface (TV series), UK sketch show
- Dogface (album), by Leash Law
- DogFace (book), by Barbara O'Brien
- Sophie Reade, who temporarily had her name changed to Dogface to become a housemate on Big Brother 2009 (UK)

== See also ==
- Dog-faced bat (disambiguation), various species of family Molossidae
