= Lesser Antillean funnel-eared bat =

Scientific classification
- Domain: Eukaryota
- Kingdom: Animalia
- Phylum: Chordata
- Class: Mammalia
- Order: Chiroptera
- Family: Natalidae
- Genus: Natalus
- Species: N. stramineus
- Subspecies: N. s. stramineus

Trinomial name
- Natalus stramineus stramineus Gray, 1838

Subspecies of bat

The Lesser Antillean funnel-eared bat (Natalus stramineus stramineus) is a subspecies of the Mexican funnel-eared bat (Natalus stramineus) found to be endemic to the Lesser Antilles islands of the Caribbean.

The subspecies was first described by George Gilbert Goodwin in his 1959 book Bats of the subgenus Natalus, and then a study in 1997 used genetic data to further confirm a separate species in the Antillean islands.

The species is listed as endemic to Saba by BirdLife International, although they have been sighted in Antigua, a specimen was collected on Nevis in 2001, and remains were collected on Saint Martin in 2002.
