= Mexican greater funnel-eared bat =

Conservation status
- Least Concern (IUCN 3.1)

Scientific classification
- Kingdom: Animalia
- Phylum: Chordata
- Class: Mammalia
- Order: Chiroptera
- Family: Natalidae
- Genus: Natalus
- Species: N. mexicanus

Binomial name
- Natalus mexicanus Miller, 1902

Synonyms
- Natalus stramineus mexicanus Goodwin, 1959; Natalus lanatus Tejedor, 2005

Species of bat

The Mexican greater funnel-eared bat (Natalus mexicanus) is a species of bat found in Central America. While initially and currently described as a species, from 1959 to 2006 it was considered a subspecies of the Mexican funnel-eared bat, Natalus stramineus.

== Taxonomy ==
Gerrit Smith Miller Jr. described it as a new species in 1902. Other authors followed in listing N. mexicanus as a full species in 1949. In 1959, George Goodwin revised it from a species to a subspecies of the Mexican funnel-eared bat, Natalus stramineus. It was revised again to species status in 2006. In 2012, another funnel-eared bat of Mexico, Natalus lanatus, was synonymized with Natalus mexicanus, so that there is currently only one recognized species of funnel-eared bat in Mexico.

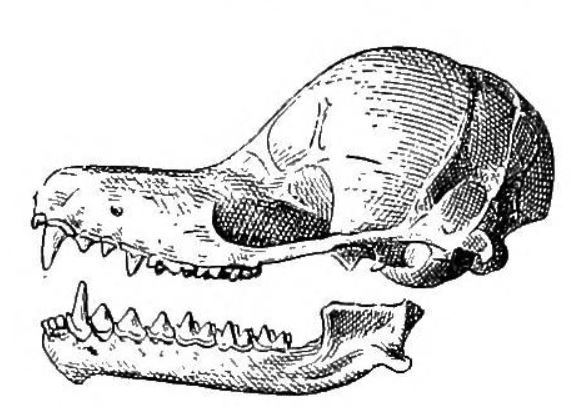
Natalus mexicanus skull

== Description ==
It is a small bat, weighing only 3–5 g (0.11–0.18 oz). Its forearms are 36–39 mm (1.4–1.5 in) long. Its back is a pale orange-brown or yellow in color, and its belly is yellow. It has broad, cream-colored ears with blackish margins. The skin of its face is pale pink. Its limbs are very long in relation to its body size. Its wings are long and narrow with pale brown flight membranes.

== Biology ==
Females are monoestrous, or capable of becoming pregnant once a year. Pregnant females have been observed January through July, and gestation is thought to last 8–10 months due to slow fetal development. The litter size is one pup. It roosts in caves during the day. It is colonial, forming groups of up to 300 individuals.

== Range and habitat ==
It is found in Belize, Costa Rica, El Salvador, Guatemala, Honduras, Mexico, Nicaragua, and Panama. It is not found at elevations above 2,400 m (7,900 ft), though most observations of it occur at around 300 m (980 ft). It prefers dry and semi-deciduous forests. Occasionally, it is also encountered in conifer forests.

As of 2019, it is evaluated as least concern by the IUCN. While its population trend is unknown, it is thought that it is, at least, not declining rapidly. It is threatened by cave disturbance by tourists and by mining activities.
