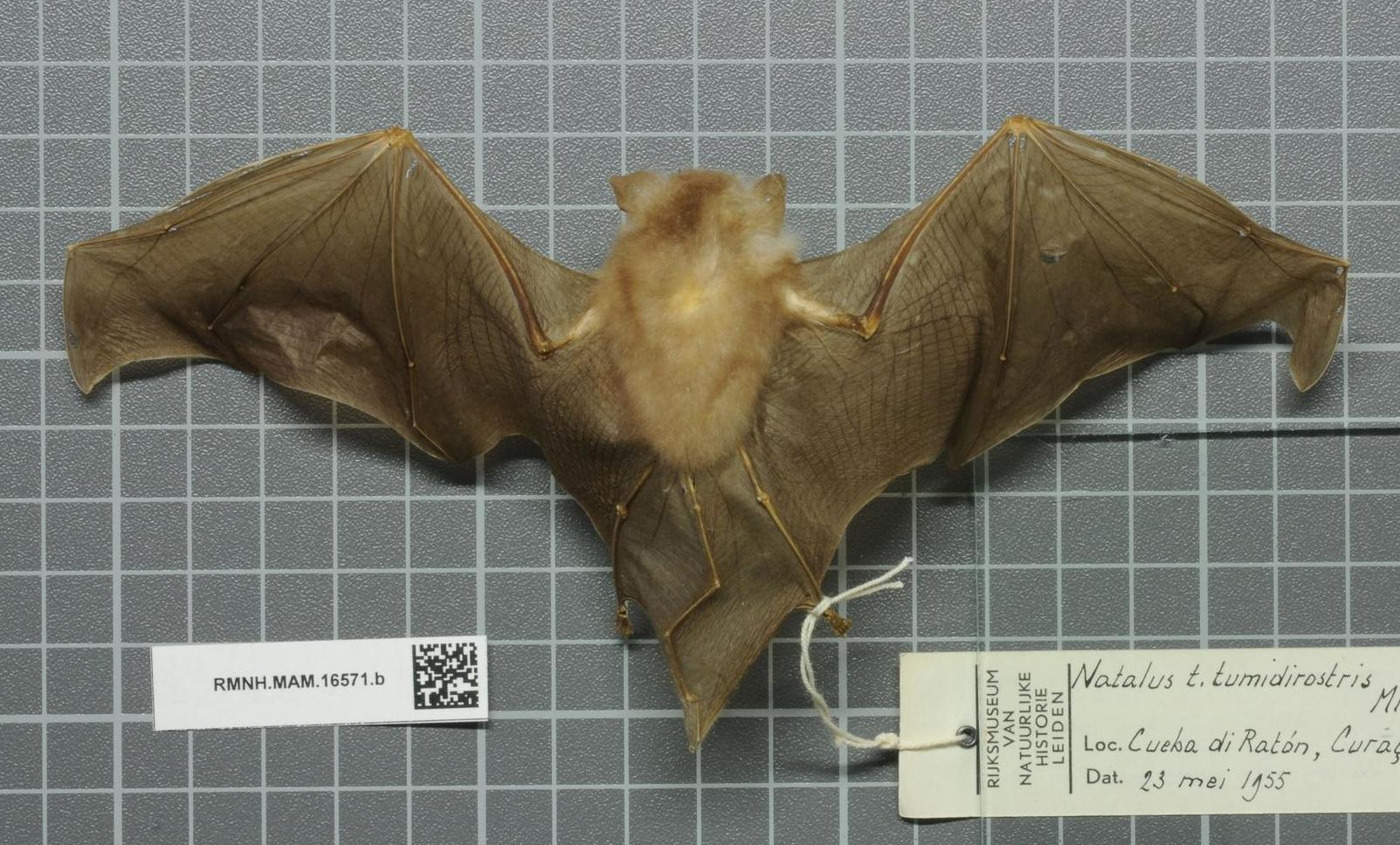

Conservation status
- Least Concern (IUCN 3.1)

Scientific classification
- Kingdom: Animalia
- Phylum: Chordata
- Class: Mammalia
- Infraclass: Placentalia
- Order: Chiroptera
- Family: Natalidae
- Genus: Natalus
- Species: N. tumidirostris

Binomial name
- Natalus tumidirostris Miller, 1900

Synonyms
- Natalus continentis Thomas, 1911; Natalus tumidirostris continentis (Thomas, 1911); Phodotes tumidirostris continentis Thomas, 1911; Natalus haymani Goodwin, 1959; Natalus tumidirostris haymani Goodwin, 1959; Natalus stramineus tronchonii Linares, 1971; Natalus tumidirostris tumidirostris Miller, 1900

= Trinidadian funnel-eared bat =

Species of bat

The Trinidadian funnel-eared bat (Natalus tumidirostris) is a species of bat in the family Natalidae. It is endemic to Colombia, Venezuela, Guyana, Suriname, French Guiana, Trinidad and Tobago and Netherlands Antilles.
