= Bahaman funnel-eared bat =

Bahamian funnel-eared bat

Conservation status
- Near Threatened (IUCN 3.1)

Scientific classification
- Kingdom: Animalia
- Phylum: Chordata
- Class: Mammalia
- Order: Chiroptera
- Family: Natalidae
- Genus: Chilonatalus
- Species: C. tumidifrons

Binomial name
- Chilonatalus tumidifrons Miller, 1903

Synonyms
- Natalus tumidifrons (Miller, 1903)

Species of bat

The Bahaman funnel-eared bat (Chilonatalus tumidifrons) is a species of bat in the family Natalidae.

It is endemic to the Bahamas. It was first discovered by Miller in 1903. They are listed as "near threatened" by the IUCN due to the decline in their habitat.

== Description and biology ==
Females gather in maternity colonies where they give birth and care for their single offspring. Average gestation period is around ten months. Birth occurs in the late dry season, suggesting that mating occurs after the late dry season. The offspring are relatively large, often close to 50% of their mothers' weight. Females are fully responsible for giving care to their newborn. The population of the Bahaman funnel-eared bat is decreasing due to their declining habitat environment.

All funnel-eared bats have very large and funnel-shaped ears. These allow them to detect near-silent sounds and return echoes through echolocation. Small papillae cover their ears, increasing auditory sensitivity. Like other animals, they use olfactory and tactile cues to communicate.

== Habitat and ecology ==
This species is not very well known, because they are only located in Bahamian dry deciduous forests. The deep caves where they are found, are hot and moist and are maintained constantly. During active hours, Bahaman funnel-eared bats forage for insects in the dense areas of the surrounding forests. The bats are hard to catch because they are very agile flyers.

Nothing is known about Bahaman funnel-eared bats home range, but they live near roosting caves.

== Threats ==
Bahaman funnel-eared bats are threatened due to their reliance on caves, and because of climate change. The main conservation action needed is protecting the cave they live in.
