= Jamaican greater funnel-eared bat =

Conservation status
- Critically Endangered (IUCN 3.1)

Scientific classification
- Kingdom: Animalia
- Phylum: Chordata
- Class: Mammalia
- Order: Chiroptera
- Family: Natalidae
- Genus: Natalus
- Species: N. jamaicensis

Binomial name
- Natalus jamaicensis (Goodwin, 1959)

Synonyms
- Natalus major jamaicensis

Species of bat

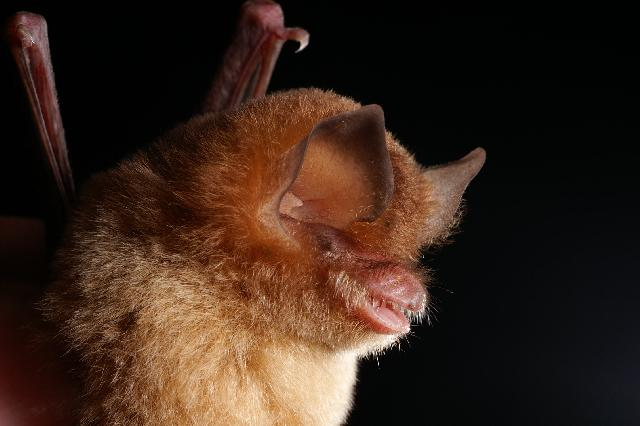

The Jamaican greater funnel-eared bat (Natalus jamaicensis) is a species of funnel-eared bat endemic to Jamaica. Initially described as the subspecies Natalus major jamaicensis and later as a subspecies of Natalus stramineus, it has since been recognized as its own distinct species. Similar in appearance to other members of the genus Natalus, this bat resides exclusively in St. Clair Cave, Jamaica, where it feeds on insects.

== Taxonomy ==
The genus Natalus was first reported in Jamaica in 1951 by Koopman and Williams, based on a partial mandible collected by H. E. Anthony during his 1919–1920 expedition. They referred to the species as N. major. When a live specimen was first encountered in 1959, it was scientifically described by George Gilbert Goodwin as Natalus major jamaicensis. The type specimen consisted of the skin and skull of a male bat, collected from St. Clair Cave, St. Catherine Parish, Jamaica, by C.B. Lewis on March 5, 1954.

== Description ==
Goodwin described N. major jamaicensis as distinguishable from the "typical" N. major by its "higher, shorter, and more globular braincase, more slender, longer, and flatter rostrum, the sides of which are concave instead of inflated and convex as in major, and by the noticeably narrower inter-orbital space." Their forearms measure 44–46 mm (1.7–1.8 in) in length and are buffy in color.

== Distribution and habitat ==
The Jamaican greater funnel-eared bat is found exclusively in St. Clair Cave, Jamaica.

== Conservation status ==
The IUCN has categorized the Jamaican greater funnel-eared bat as Critically Endangered due to its limited extent of occurrence of less than 100 km², its confinement to a single location, and the ongoing decline in the extent and quality of its habitat. A population of feral cats also resides in the cave where these bats are found, likely preying on them. In 2013, Bat Conservation International included this species on its list of 35 priority species for worldwide conservation.
