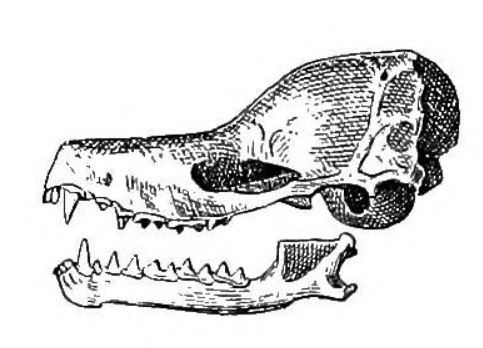

Conservation status
- Least Concern (IUCN 3.1)

Scientific classification
- Kingdom: Animalia
- Phylum: Chordata
- Class: Mammalia
- Order: Chiroptera
- Family: Natalidae
- Genus: Nyctiellus; Gervais, 1855
- Species: N. lepidus

Binomial name
- Nyctiellus lepidus Gervais, 1837
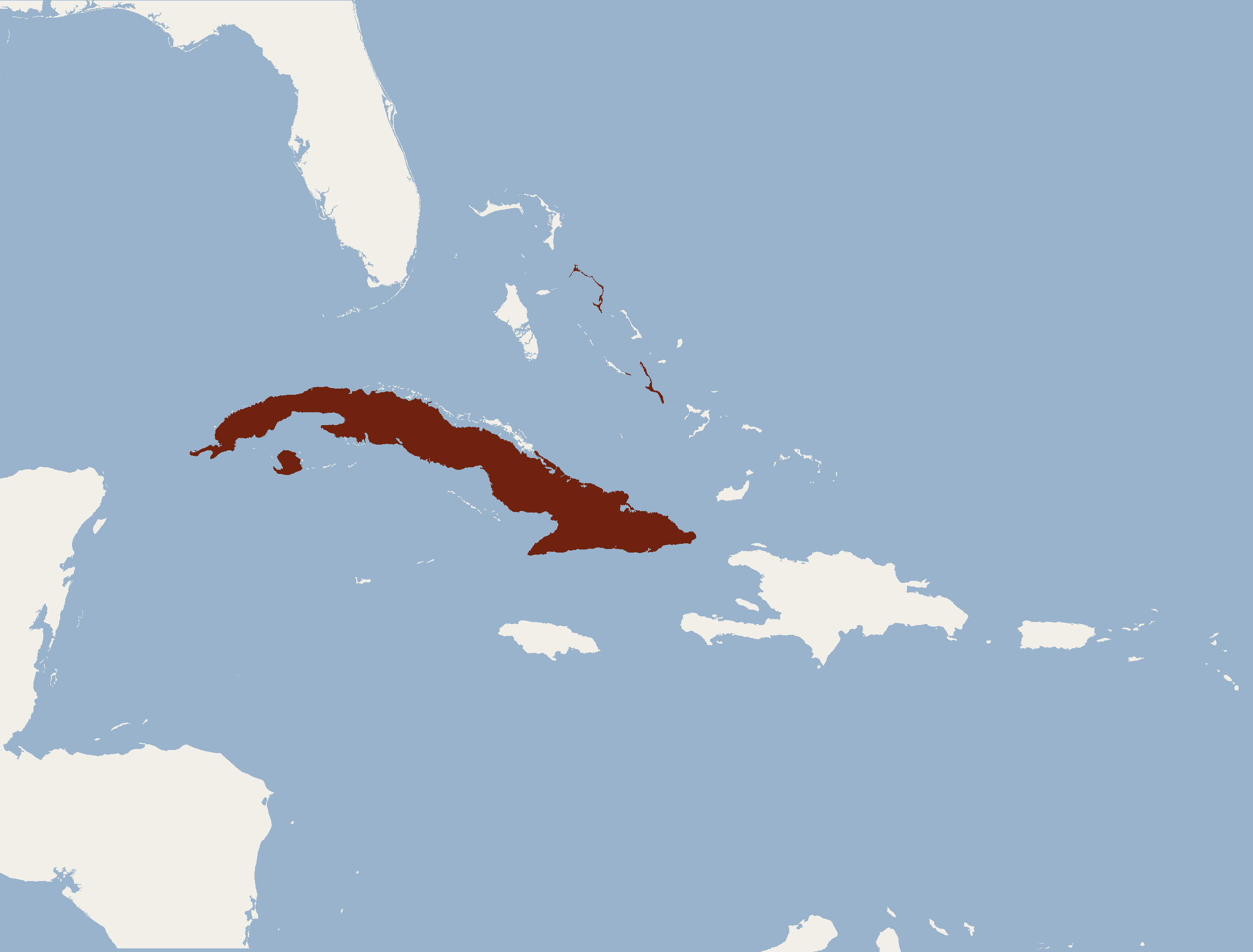

Synonyms
- Natalus lepidus (Gervais, 1837)

= Gervais's funnel-eared bat =

Species of bat

Gervais's funnel-eared bat (Nyctiellus lepidus) is a species of bat in the family Natalidae. It is the only species within the genus Nyctiellus. It is found in Bahamas and Cuba.

== Discovery ==
Nyctiellus lepidus was first described by French zoologist Paul Gervais in 1837. It was originally described under the name Vespertilio lepidus, based on a specimen from Cuba. The original description was published in L'Institut in 1837. The type specimen is a holotype, and Cuba is recorded as the type locality.

In 1855, Gervais established the genus Nyctiellus and placed Vespertilio lepidus in it as Nyctiellus lepidus. The species subsequently appeared under other generic combinations, including Natalus lepidus, but it is currently recognised as Nyctiellus lepidus. It is also the type species of the genus Nyctiellus.

== Description ==
It is a small and delicate bat with broad wings, a long tail and a large interfemoral membrane. It has large, forward-pointing ears that give the species its characteristic funnel-like appearance. The inner surface of the ears is convex and extends almost to the eyes. The species has a long, relatively plain muzzle and dark yellow to brown fur. Adults weigh approximately 5–10 g.

The species also has morphological characteristics typical of funnel-eared bats. Its upper inner incisors point inward, while the lower incisors are relatively small. Adult males possess a subcutaneous structure known as the natalid organ on the forehead. This structure contains numerous sensory cells, although its exact function is not well understood.

It is adapted for flight in forested environments and has a distinctive combination of broad wings and a long tail. Its large ears and specialised facial structures are characteristic features of the species and its family, Natalidae.
