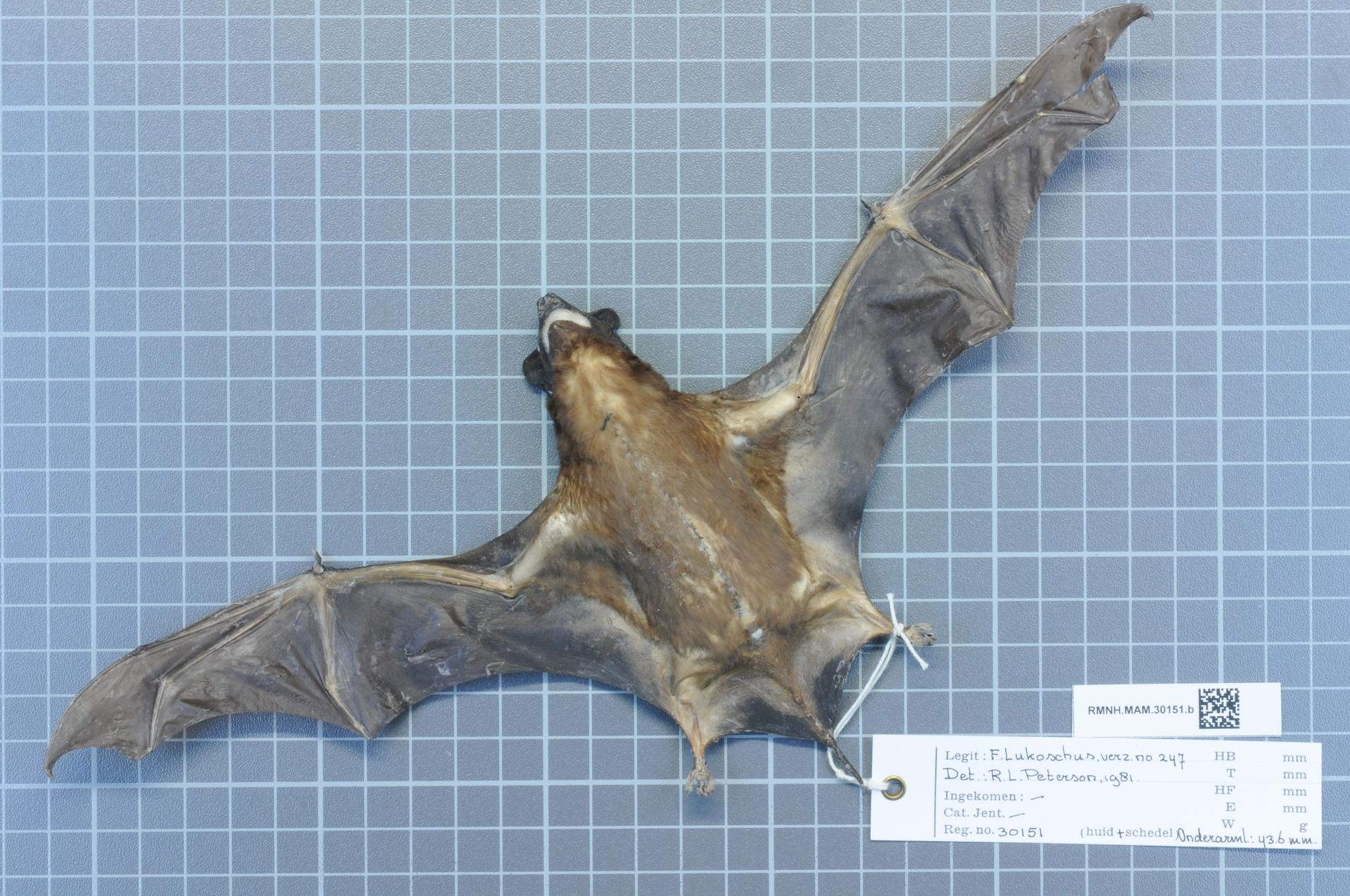
- Preserved C. abrasus specimen in the Naturalis Biodiversity Center

Scientific classification
- Kingdom: Animalia
- Phylum: Chordata
- Class: Mammalia
- Order: Chiroptera
- Family: Molossidae
- Genus: Cynomops; Thomas, 1920

Type species
- Molossus cerastes Thomas, 1901

Species
- See text

= Cynomops =

Genus of bats

Cynomops is a genus of Central and South American dog-faced bats in the family Molossidae. It has sometimes been considered a subgenus of Molossops. It contains the following species:

- Cinnamon dog-faced bat (C. abrasus)
- Freeman's dog-faced bat (C. freemani)
- Greenhall's dog-faced bat (C. greenhalli)
- Cynomops kuizha
- Cynomops mastivus (C. mastivus)
- Mexican dog-faced bat (C. mexicanus)
- Miller's dog-faced bat (C. milleri)
- Para dog-faced bat (C. paranus)
- Southern dog-faced bat (C. planirostris)
- Waorani dog-faced bat (C. tonkigui)

== Phylogeny ==
- Cynomops
  - - C. mexicanus
    - C. freemani
  - - C. planirostris
    - - - C. milleri
        - C. tonkigui
      - - C. abrasus
        - C. paranus
        - - C. greenhalli
          - C. mastivus

Phylogeny of Cynomops

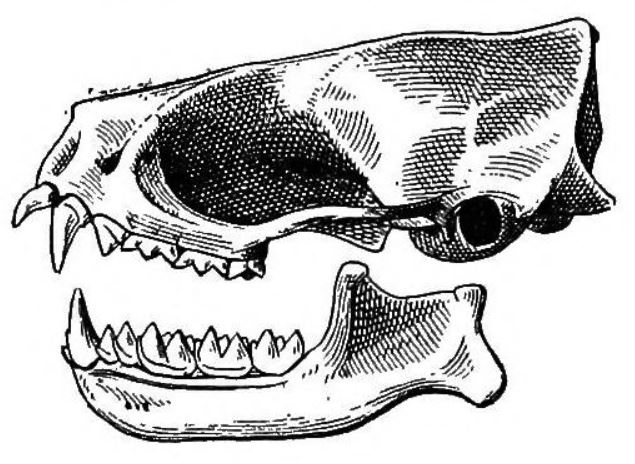
Skull of Cynomops planirostris
