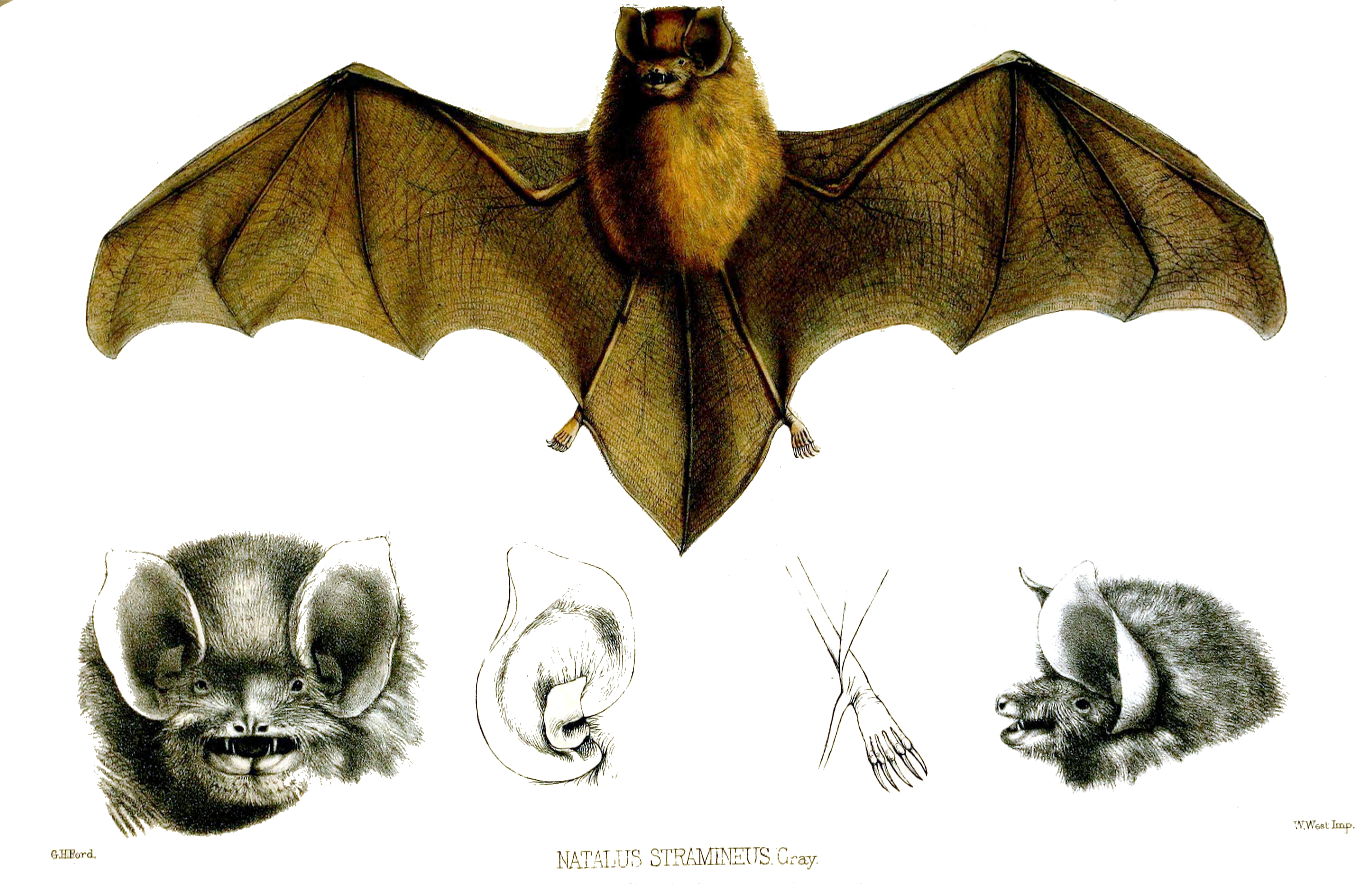
- Mexican funnel-eared bat (Natalus stramineus)

Scientific classification
- Kingdom: Animalia
- Phylum: Chordata
- Class: Mammalia
- Order: Chiroptera
- Family: Natalidae
- Genus: Natalus; Gray, 1838

Type species
- Natalus stramineus Gray, 1838

Species
- See Text
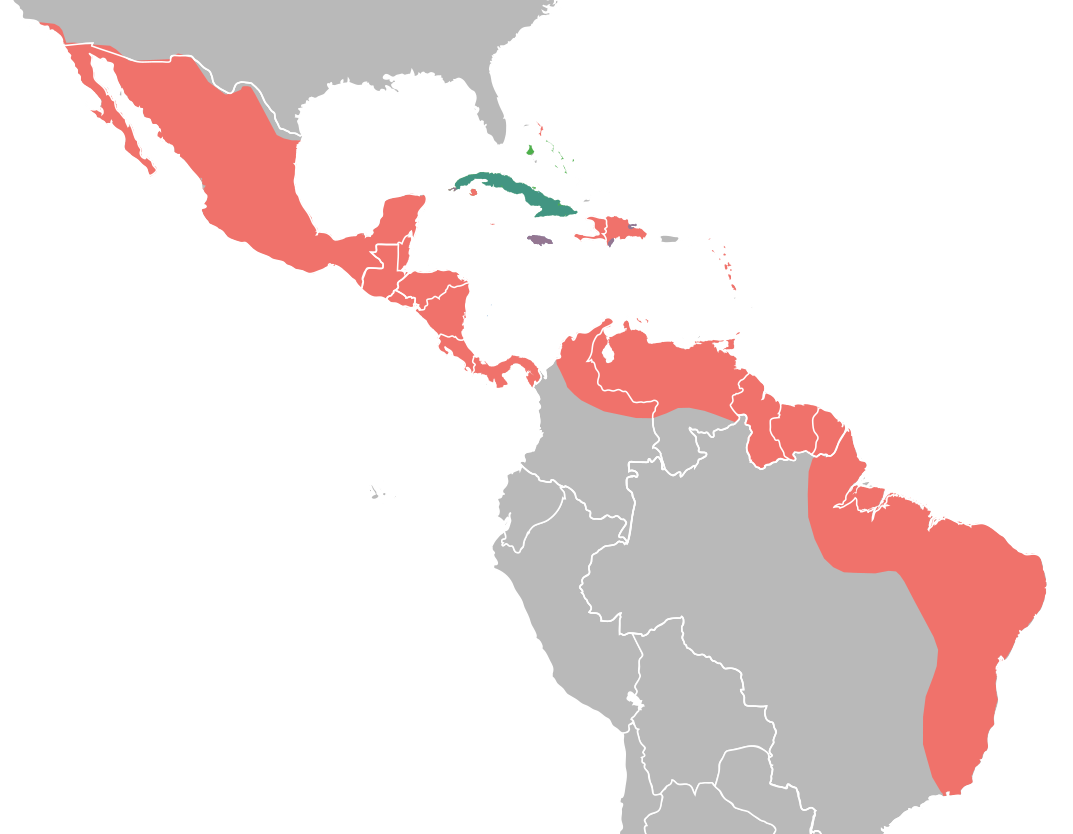
- Natalidae distribution Natalus in red; purple is overlap of Chilonatalus and Natalus

= Natalus =

Genus of bats

The genus Natalus of funnel-eared bats is found from Mexico to Brazil and the Caribbean islands. They are slender bats with unusually long tails and, as their name suggests, funnel-shaped ears. They are small, at only 3.5 to 5.5 cm in length, with brown, grey, yellow, or reddish fur. Their tail is completely enclosed in the interfemoral membrane. Adult males have a natalid organ, a large glad-like organ, on the muzzle or face. Their skulls are delicate and extended. They have swollen, rounded braincase and narrow, somewhat tubular rostrum. They have nineteen teeth on both sides, with two upper and three lower being incisors, one upper and lower canine, three upper and lower premolars, and three upper and lower molars. Like many other bats, they are insectivorous, and roost in caves. The genus is similar to the Furipteridae and Thyropteridae genera. All three genera have mostly the same geographic ranges.

Eight species belong to this genus, with cranial and external differences:

Name	Common name	Authority	Conservation status	Distribution	Reference
Natalus jamaicensis	Jamaican greater funnel-eared bat	Goodwin, 1959	Critically Endangered	Jamaica	
Natalus major	Hispaniolan greater funnel-eared bat	Miller, 1902	Near Threatened	Hispaniola	
Natalus mexicanus	Mexican greater funnel-eared bat	Miller, 1902	Least Concern	Belize, Costa Rica, El Salvador, Guatemala, Honduras, Mexico, Nicaragua, and Panama	
Natalus primus	Cuban greater funnel-eared bat	Anthony, 1919	Vulnerable	Cuba	
Natalus stramineus	Mexican funnel-eared bat	Gray, 1838	Least Concern	Anguilla, Antigua, Barbuda, Dominica, Guadeloupe, Marie Galante, Martinique, Montserrat, Nevis, Saba	
Natalus tumidirostris	Trinidadian funnel-eared bat	Miller, 1900	Least Concern	Northern Colombia, Venezuela, Guyana, French Guiana, Trinidad and Tobago, Curaçao, and Bonaire	

== Etymology ==
The genus name Natalus is derived from the Latin word meaning "related to one's birth." The name was chosen because the bats of this genus are small and look like newborns even as adults.
