= DogFace (book) =

2014 book by Barbara O'Brien

- Cover of the book, DogFace
- Author: Barbara O’Brien
- Genre: Photographs
- Publisher: 2014; (Viking Press); (Penguin Random House)
- Publication place: United States
- ISBN: 978-0525426653

DogFace is a book of photographs of dogs by photographer and animal trainer Barbara O'Brien. The book features portraits of 100 dogs of varying breeds, showing different expressions and emotions. The book was published in 2014 by Viking Press, owned by Penguin Random House.

== Reception ==
DogFace received generally positive reviews.

Publishers Weekly stated, "No season in dog books would be complete without a breed guide. ... animal trainer and photographer Barbara O'Brien puts a spin on the traditional form with Dogface (Viking Studio, Oct.), a title that showcases images of 100 breeds in all their emotive, expressive, near-human element."

The Telegraph stated "Photographer Barbara O'Brien has treated canines to professionally shot portraits. Her 'Dog Face' series is an amusing collection of hound dog expressions and poochy posing. Subjects include Jiff, a cute Pomeranian with head cocked quizzically to one side..."

The Chicago Tribune stated "If a dog smile makes you smile, you'll relish leafing through this breezy stocking stuffer. The book features portraits of 100 dogs, many smiling."
