= Freeman's dog-faced bat =

Scientific classification
- Kingdom: Animalia
- Phylum: Chordata
- Class: Mammalia
- Order: Chiroptera
- Family: Molossidae
- Genus: Cynomops
- Species: C. freemani

Binomial name
- Cynomops freemani Moras, Gergorin, Sattler, & Tavares, 2018

Synonyms
- Molossops freemani

Species of bat

The Freeman’s dog-faced bat (Cynomops freemani), is a Central American bat species of the family Molossidae. It is endemic to Panama.
