= Cuban greater funnel-eared bat =

Conservation status
- Vulnerable (IUCN 3.1)

Scientific classification
- Kingdom: Animalia
- Phylum: Chordata
- Class: Mammalia
- Order: Chiroptera
- Family: Natalidae
- Genus: Natalus
- Species: N. primus

Binomial name
- Natalus primus (Anthony, 1919)
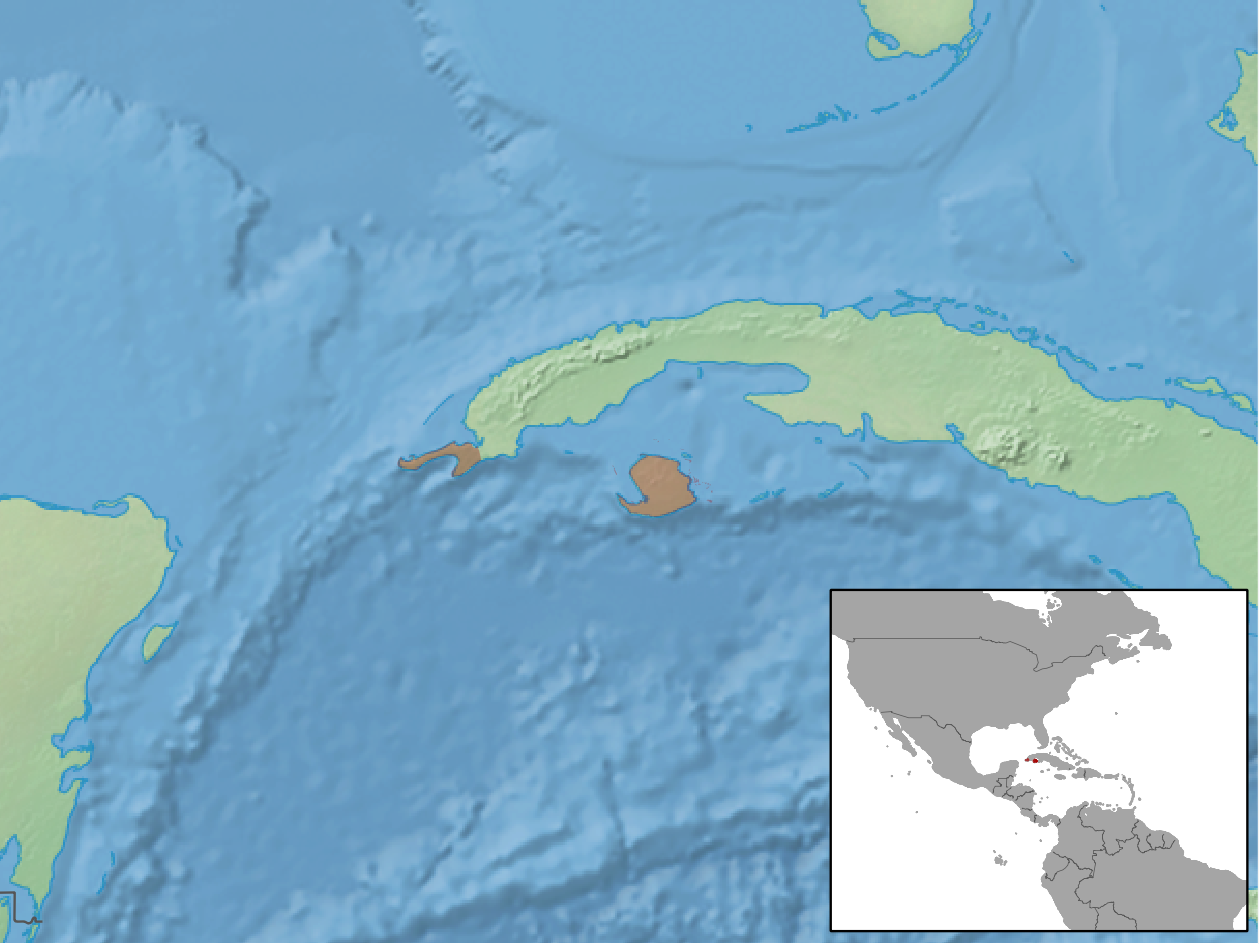

Species of bat

The Cuban greater funnel-eared bat (Natalus primus) is a species of funnel-eared bat. It is endemic to a cave in westernmost Cuba.

== Taxonomy ==
The bats within the genus Natalus have had a complex taxonomic history due to its morphological conservatism. The taxonomy of Natalidae has been recently updated by the discovery and rediscovery of live species and fossils, and on the basis of new morphological and molecular evidence.

== Description ==
The Cuban greater funnel-eared bat has funnel-like ears and a tail as long as the head and body combined. The legs are shorter than the forearm, dorsal hair length is 8–9 millimetres (0.31–0.35 in), ventral hair length is 7–8 millimetres (0.28–0.31 in) long. Each hair is divided into three different color bands going from dark on the base, light in the middle, and the tip a little darker than the middle. They have black, stiff hairs above the upper lip, much like a moustache, and white hairs below the lower lip. They have tan and reddish-brown fur with a paler belly.

They have a diet consisting largely of moths, crickets, and beetles. In 1992, the first living population was discovered in a cave in Cueva La Barca. Caribbean hurricanes early in the evolutionary history of Natalids may account for specialized cave roosting.

== Conservation ==
When Harold E. Anthony described this species in 1919, he thought it was an extinct form because it was only known from fossil localities on Cuba, on Isla de la Juventud, Grand Cayman and various islands in the Bahamas. In 1992, a living population has been rediscovered. Natalus primus is considered vulnerable and only inhabits one cave in Cueva La Barca on Isla de la Juventud island and province. The population is abundant in that single cave, but this species is likely to go extinct due to its limited dispersal range, human disturbance and loss of habitat. It is estimated that there are only a few thousand individuals.

This species is known to have become extirpated throughout most of Cuba suggesting a population decline that may have continued until the present. The survival of Cuban bats is threatened by forest destruction and cave modification.

Habitat loss through erosion is a major concern. The ongoing collapse of the cave roof is likely to upset the thermal balance in this hot cave and result in Natalus primus extinction. Cave-dwelling Cuban bat species conservation should be a cooperative effort promoting research and habitat management.
