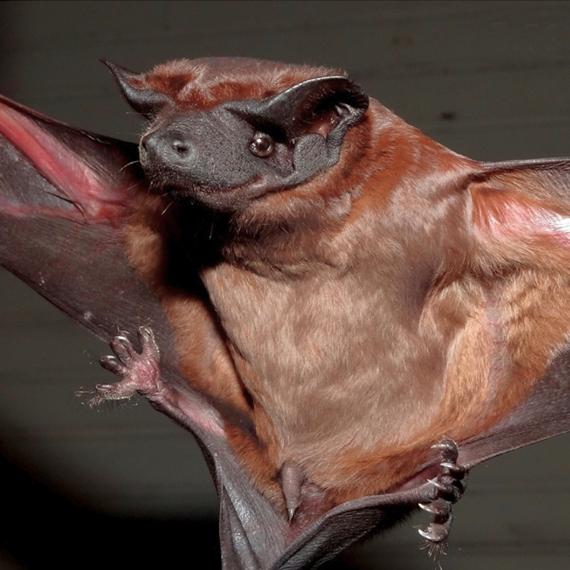
- Preserved specimen in the Naturalis Biodiversity Center

Conservation status
- Data Deficient (IUCN 3.1)

Scientific classification
- Kingdom: Animalia
- Phylum: Chordata
- Class: Mammalia
- Order: Chiroptera
- Family: Molossidae
- Genus: Cynomops
- Species: C. abrasus

Binomial name
- Cynomops abrasus Temminck, 1827

= Cinnamon dog-faced bat =

Species of bat

The cinnamon dog-faced bat (Cynomops abrasus), is a South American bat species of the family Molossidae. It is found in northern and central South America.

== Taxonomy ==
The bat belongs to the genus Cynomops, which was recently split from the genus Molossops.

There are four recognised subspecies:

- Cynomops abrasus abrasus (Temminck, 1827)
- C. a. brachymeles (Peters, 1866)
- C. a. cerastes (Thomas, 1901)
- C. a. mastivus (Thomas, 1911)

== Description ==
The dorsal fur is brown, dark brown or chestnut. The ventral fur is similar in color to the dorsal fur. A dense patch of fur is present on the wing, located on the top back third of the forearm and propatagial membrane. There is also a second patch of fur on the bottom, back three-quarters of the forearm that extends across the patagium near the wrist to the base of the fourth metacarpal. These patches are darker in color than the membrane.

The bats have a broad face with widely separated ears. There are no wrinkles on the lips. There is also no nose leaf present. The bats display sexual dimorphism. The average total length is 121.1 mm (4.77 in) and the average tail length is 37.6 mm (1.48 in). The forearm length in males is 44.2–49.0 mm (1.74–1.93 in) and in females it is 41.0–45.0 mm (1.61–1.77 in). The greatest skull length is 19.5–24.3 mm (0.77–0.96 in) in males and 18.4–21.5 mm (0.72–0.85 in) in females.

== Biology ==
The bat is insectivorous. They typically feed on hard-shelled insects.

== Habitat and distribution ==
The species is found on the eastern side of the Andes in northern Argentina, Bolivia, Brazil, Colombia, Ecuador, French Guiana, Guyana, Peru, Paraguay, Suriname and Venezuela. The bat is an open-air hunter and is limited to forests. It is found in high and dense forests in Argentina and near floodable lands in Paraguay.

The bat roosts in colonies of up to 75 individuals. The bat roosts in decayed logs and hollow trees, and tends to pick relatively warm area to roost.

== Conservation ==
The bat is listed as data-deficient by the IUCN because of a paucity of records of the bat and the lack of knowledge about its habitat and status. The species could be threatened by deforestation occurring in its range.
