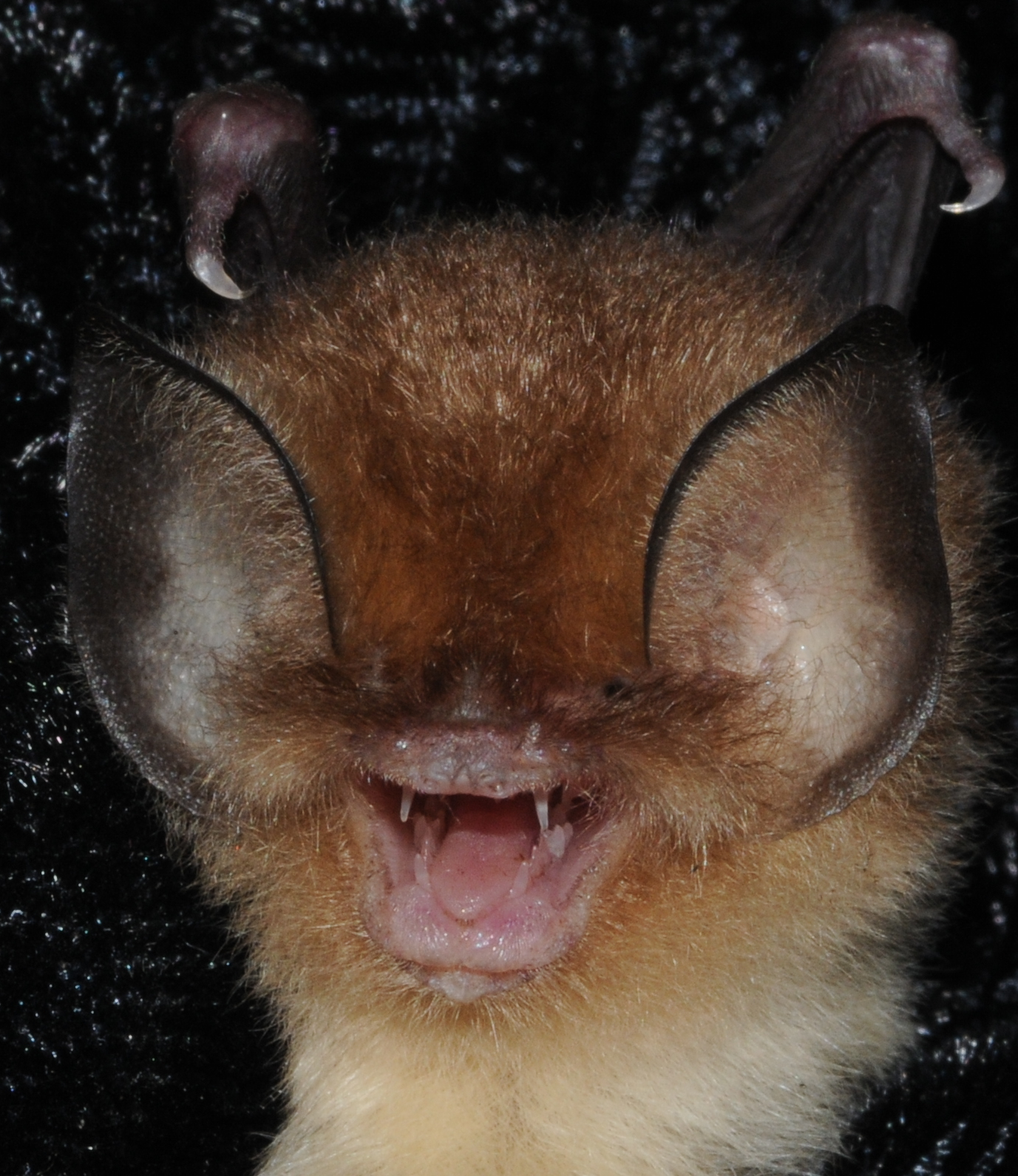
- Chilonatalus micropus captured in Jamaica in 2011

Scientific classification
- Kingdom: Animalia
- Phylum: Chordata
- Class: Mammalia
- Order: Chiroptera
- Family: Natalidae
- Genus: Chilonatalus; Miller, 1898

Type species
- Natalus micropus Dobson, 1880

Species
- Chilonatalus macer; Chilonatalus micropus; Chilonatalus tumidifrons
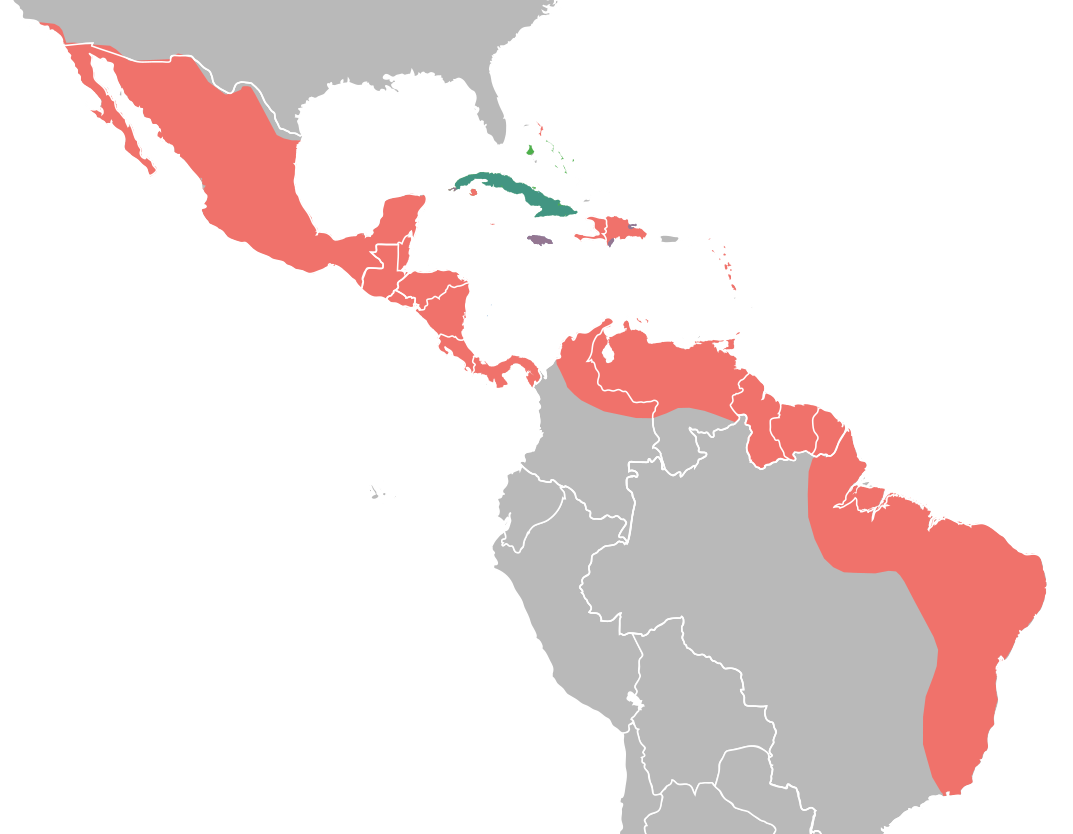
- Natalidae distribution Chilonatalus in blue; teal (Cuba) is overlap of Chilonatalus and Nyctiellus; purple is Chilonatalus and Natalus

= Chilonatalus =

Genus of bats

The genus Chilonatalus of funnel-eared bats is found in South America and the Antilles. It has three species. New mitochondrial and nuclear DNA sequences that were analyzed with published morphological data to see the relationship of extinct natalids. It was found that this fossil taxon's phylogeny that was based on morphological data can be assumed that the Chilonatalus micropus is and one other species is a widespread species
