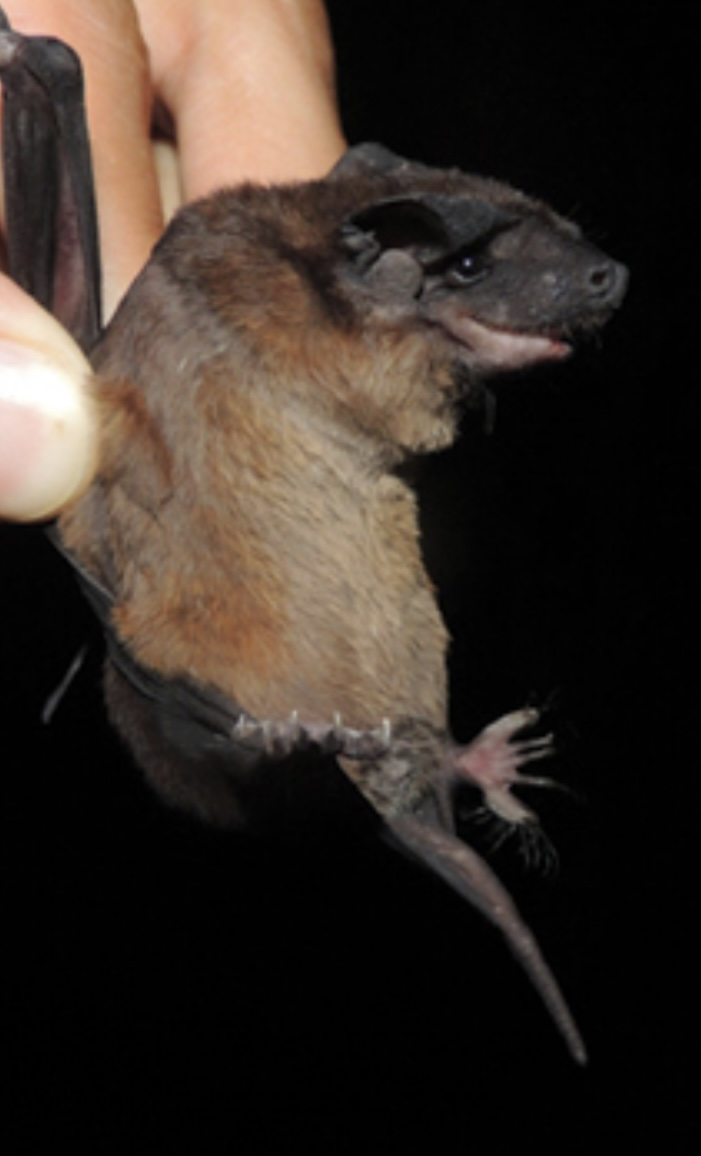

Conservation status
- Least Concern (IUCN 3.1)

Scientific classification
- Kingdom: Animalia
- Phylum: Chordata
- Class: Mammalia
- Order: Chiroptera
- Family: Molossidae
- Genus: Cynomops
- Species: C. greenhalli

Binomial name
- Cynomops greenhalli Goodwin, 1958

Synonyms
- Molossops greenhalli

= Greenhall's dog-faced bat =

South American bat

Greenhall's dog-faced bat (Cynomops greenhalli) is a South American bat species of the family Molossidae. It lives in Colombia, Peru, Ecuador, Venezuela, the Guianas, northeastern Brazil and Trinidad.

This insect-eating bat measures 40–97 mm in length. It has yellowish-brown to black coloration on its upper body and a grey underside, with a broad face and widely separated eyes. Its ears are short and rounded, the antitragus square, its lips unwrinkled and the snout broad.

The dog-faced bat lives at low elevations. Colonies of 50–77 roost in hollow branches of large trees. Males and females stay together throughout the year. It is named after Arthur Greenhall, a scientist who led the rabies program at the Trinidad Regional Virus Laboratory in Port of Spain, Trinidad.

== Sources ==
- Greenhall, Arthur M. 1961. Bats in Agriculture. A Ministry of Agriculture Publication. Trinidad and Tobago.
- LaVal, Richard. "Records of Bats from Honduras and El Salvador." Journal of Mammalogy, Vol. 50, No. 4 (November, 1969), pp. 819–822.
- Linares, Omar J. and Pablo Kiblisky. "The Karyotype and a New Record of Molossops greenhalli from Venezuela." Journal of Mammalogy, Vol. 50, No. 4 (November, 1969), pp. 831–832.
- Carter, Gerald G. "A Field key to the Bats of Trinidad." August 2000. Accessed at: https://web.archive.org/web/20070509074216/http://publish.uwo.ca/~gcarter2/Trinidad_batkey_small.pdf.
