= Natalid organ =

Sensory organs of Natalidae bats

Natalid organs, composed of cells closely resembling sensory cells, are on the heads of all adult male bats of the Natalidae family. The organs show some evidence of glandular function. The first to investigate this organ was Gerrit Miller, who referred to it as a "large, glandular swelling between and in front of the eyes."
