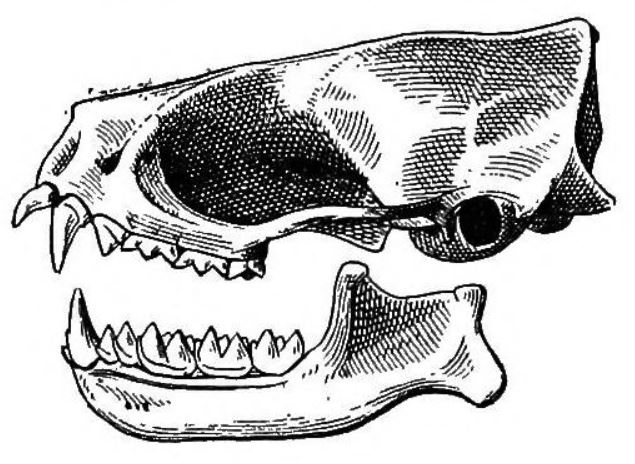

Conservation status
- Least Concern (IUCN 3.1)

Scientific classification
- Kingdom: Animalia
- Phylum: Chordata
- Class: Mammalia
- Order: Chiroptera
- Family: Molossidae
- Genus: Cynomops
- Species: C. planirostris

Binomial name
- Cynomops planirostris Peters, 1866

Synonyms
- Molossus planirostris; Molossops planirostris

= Southern dog-faced bat =

Species of bat

The southern dog-faced bat (Cynomops planirostris), is a bat species of the family Molossidae. It is found in northern Argentina, Bolivia, Brazil, Colombia, French Guiana, Guyana, Panama, Peru, Paraguay, Suriname and Venezuela.
