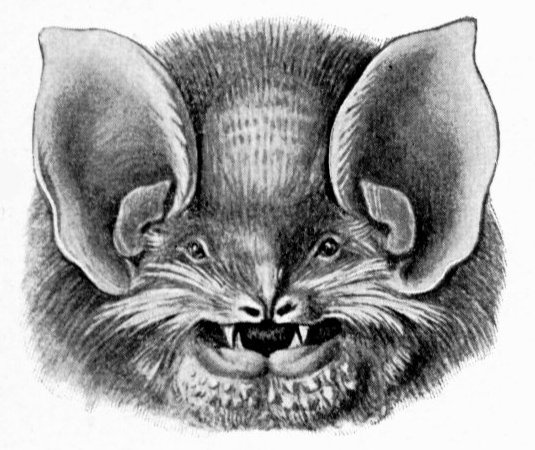
- Mexican funnel-eared bat (Natalus stramineus)

Scientific classification
- Kingdom: Animalia
- Phylum: Chordata
- Class: Mammalia
- Order: Chiroptera
- Superfamily: Vespertilionoidea
- Family: Natalidae; Gray, 1866

Type genus
- Natalus Gray, 1838

Genera
- Chilonatalus; Natalus; Nyctiellus; †Primonatalus
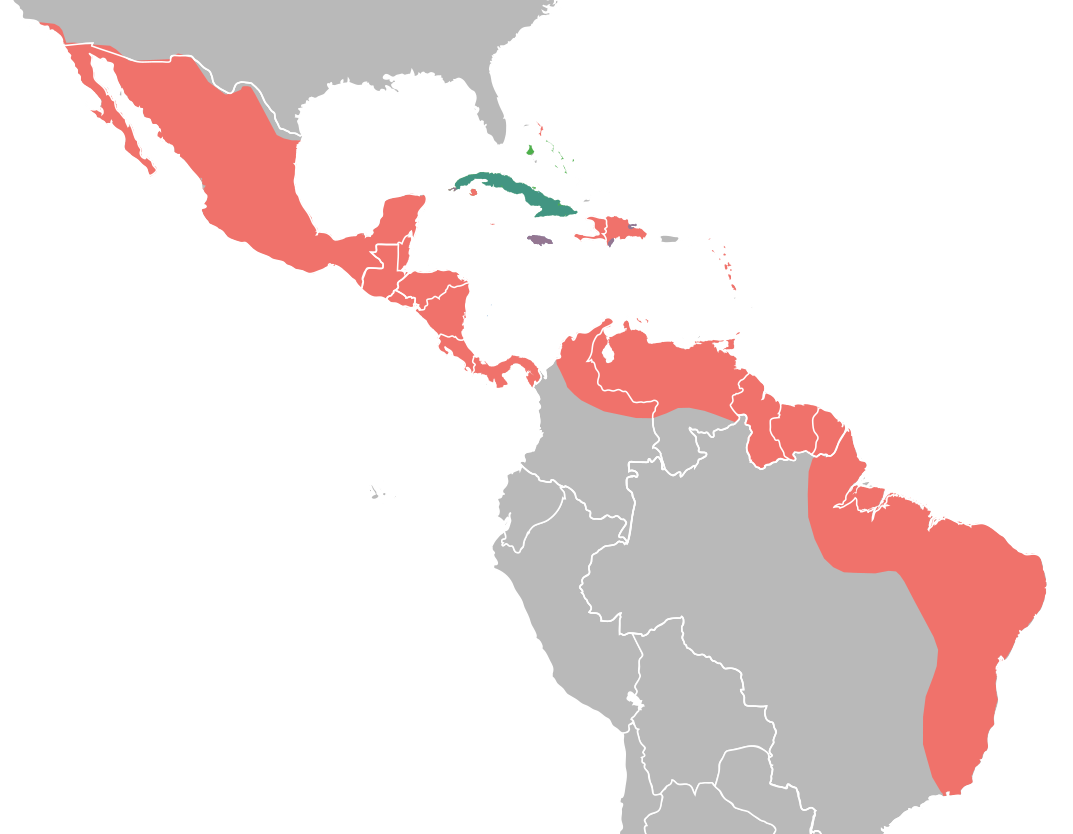
- Natalidae distribution Natalus in red, Chilonatalus in blue, Nyctiellus in green. Teal (Cuba) is overlap of Chilonatalus and Nyctiellus; purple is Chilonatalus and Natalus

= Natalidae =

Funnel-eared bats

Family of bats

The family Natalidae, or funnel-eared bats, are found from Mexico to Brazil and the Caribbean islands. The family has three genera, Chilonatalus, Natalus and Nyctiellus. They are slender bats with unusually long tails and, as their name suggests, funnel-shaped ears. They are small, at only 3.5 to 5.5 cm (1.4 to 2.2 in) in length, with brown, grey, or reddish fur. Like many other bats, they are insectivorous, and roost in caves.

Geographic changes and isolation methods have affected the differences among species within this family of Natalie's. Like the Natalus from Cueva La Barca, males seem to have longer tibias and greater skulls than that of females and when comparing them to the Greater Antilles, they have the largest body in the genus.

Natalus prefer warm and humid caves as roost sites and were mostly in Cuba but most fossils have been found there likely due to erosion. These hot caves are no longer in Cuba and that could have led to the extinction of Natalus in major areas of Cuba.

Due to the endangerment of the Natalus primus species of the Natalidae family in Cuba, they are currently only found in one distinct cave in the Guanahacabibes National Park. In order to better understand this species and efficiently recognize them to help reverse their endangered status, researchers have tracked their vocalization patterns. They found that the Natalus primus species have a distinct echolocation sounds. It was deduced that the Natalus primus create short, high- pitched tones. This finding is important to the growth of research in this field for this species because it allows scientists and wildlife researchers to gather information about this species without furthering the damage of their habitat and population.

== Classification ==
Family Natalidae contains the following 10 species in 3 genera:

- Genus Chilonatalus
  - Cuban funnel-eared bat, Chilonatalus micropus
  - Bahaman funnel-eared bat, Chilonatalus tumidifrons
- Genus Natalus
  - Brazilian funnel-eared bat, Natalus macrourus
  - Jamaican greater funnel-eared bat, Natalus jamaicensis
  - Hispaniolan greater funnel-eared bat, Natalus major
  - Mexican greater funnel-eared bat, Natalus mexicanus
  - Cuban greater funnel-eared bat, Natalus primus
  - Mexican funnel-eared bat, Natalus stramineus
  - Trinidadian funnel-eared bat, Natalus tumidirostris
- Genus Nyctiellus
  - Gervais's funnel-eared bat, Nyctiellus lepidus
