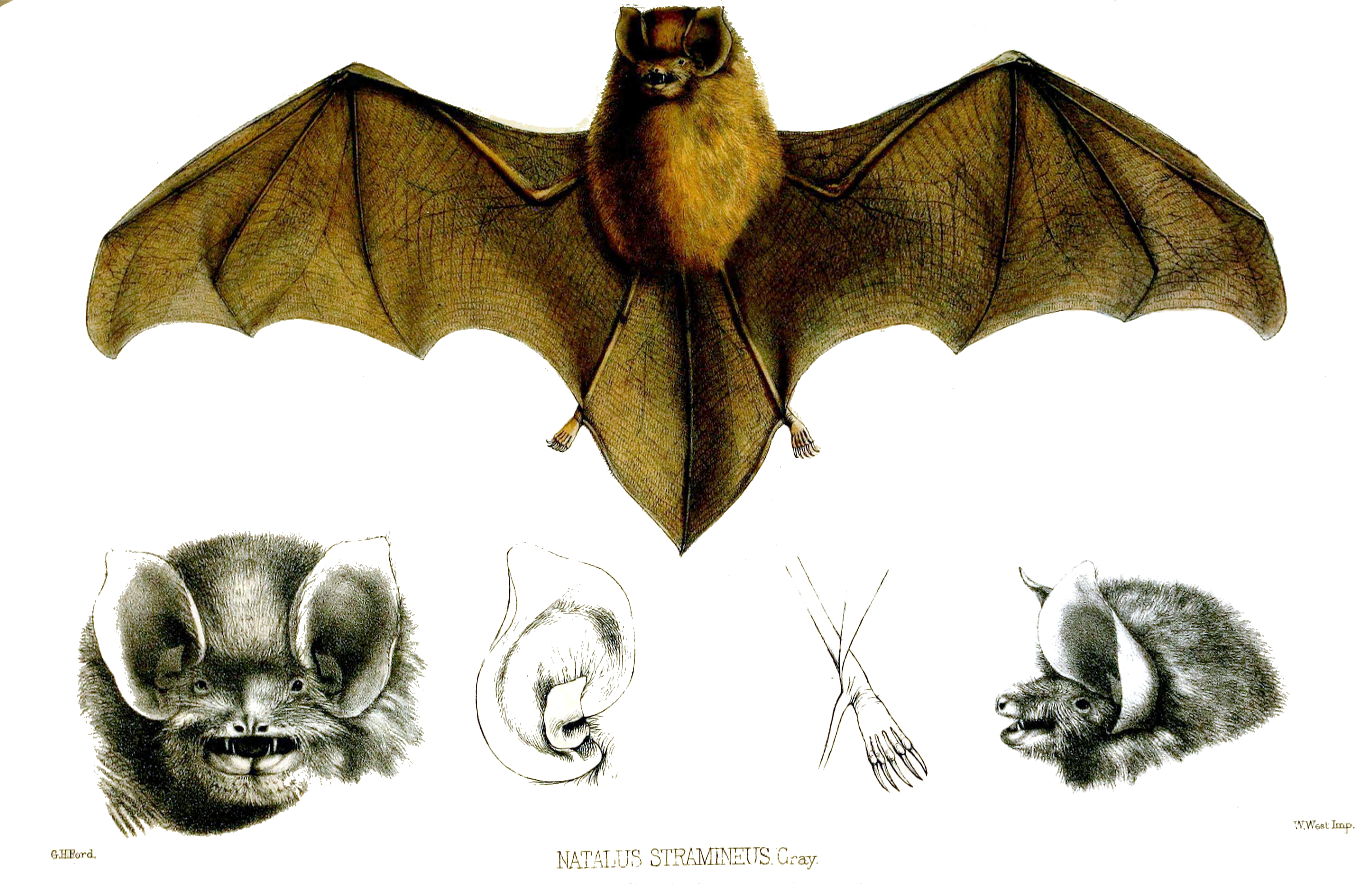

Conservation status
- Least Concern (IUCN 3.1)

Scientific classification
- Kingdom: Animalia
- Phylum: Chordata
- Class: Mammalia
- Order: Chiroptera
- Family: Natalidae
- Genus: Natalus
- Species: N. stramineus

Binomial name
- Natalus stramineus Gray, 1838

= Mexican funnel-eared bat =

Species of bat (Natalus stramineus)

The Mexican funnel-eared bat (Natalus stramineus) is a bat species. Despite its name, it is native to the Lesser Antilles in the Caribbean.

== Description ==
The Mexican funnel-eared bat gets its name from its very distinctive funnel-shaped ears. The face has a triangular shape, pale skin, and forward-tilting ears. Both sexes of this species are similar in size, unlike other species. They have brown fur, which becomes darker as it reaches the tip. They tend to live in deep and very humid caves and have groups from 100 up to 10,000 bats. Another prime difference in this bat species compared to other, is that the Natalus stramineus has the longest gestation period reported for bats (some seven months). The Mexican funnel-eared bat also has migrant characteristics since it must live in a highly humid environment. If the habitat is not as humid as their liking, their population in that habitat will drop due to many of the bats looking for a more suitable place to call home nearby. This species displays slower flight speeds than others; as insectivores, the Natalus stramineus needs greater mobility to catch insects in densely vegetated areas.
