= Gerrit Smith Miller Jr. =

U.S. zoologist and botanist (1869–1956)

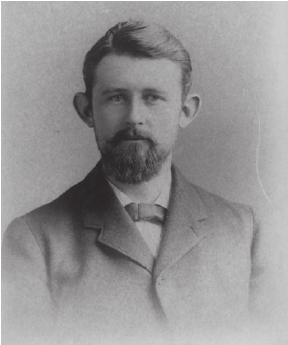
- Gerrit Smith Miller, Jr., about 1897
- Born: December 6, 1869; Peterboro, New York
- Died: February 24, 1956 (aged 86); Washington, D.C.
- Education: Harvard University
- Scientific career
- Fields: Zoology; Botany
- Workplaces: United States Department of Agriculture, Smithsonian Institution
- Author abbrev. (botany): G.S.Mill.

Gerrit Smith Miller Jr. (December 6, 1869 – February 24, 1956), was an American zoologist and botanist.

He was born in Peterboro, New York, in 1869. His great-grandfather was Gerrit Smith, the wealthy abolitionist, businessman, and politician; his father the livestock farmer Gerrit Smith Miller.

He graduated from Harvard University in 1894 and worked under Clinton Hart Merriam at the United States Department of Agriculture. He became assistant curator of mammals at the United States National Museum in Washington in 1898 and was curator from 1909 to 1940, when he became an associate in biology at the Smithsonian Institution. In 1906 he traveled to France, Spain, and Tangier on a collecting trip.

In 1915, he published results of his studies of casts of specimens associated with the Piltdown Man, concluding that the jaw actually came from a fossil ape and that the skullcap came from a modern human.

Miller was elected to the American Academy of Arts and Sciences in 1921. He was awarded the 1934 Leidy Award from the Academy of Natural Sciences of Philadelphia. He was elected to the American Philosophical Society in 1939.
