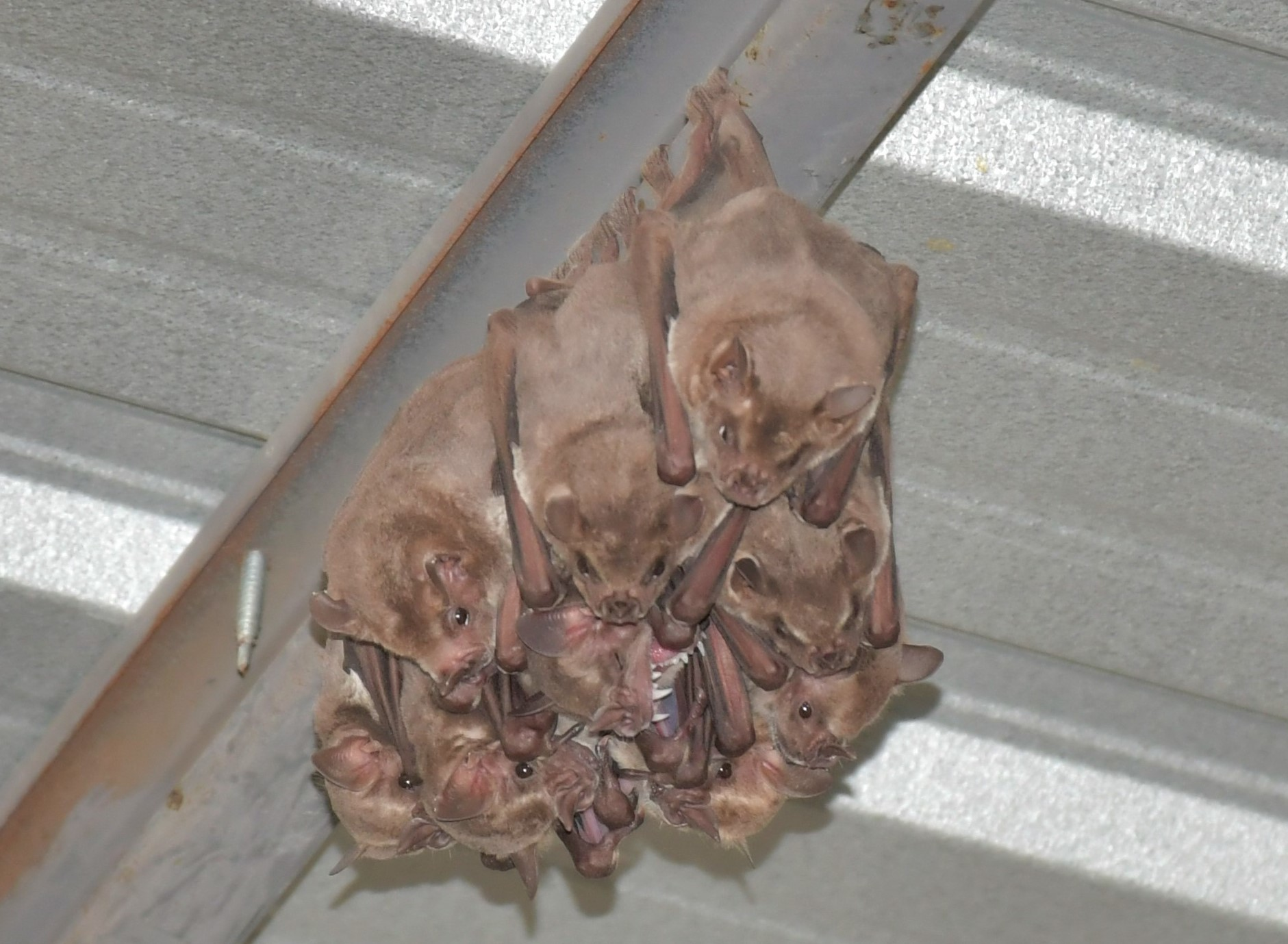

Conservation status
- Least Concern (IUCN 3.1)

Scientific classification
- Kingdom: Animalia
- Phylum: Chordata
- Class: Mammalia
- Order: Chiroptera
- Family: Phyllostomidae
- Genus: Artibeus
- Species: A. fraterculus

Binomial name
- Artibeus fraterculus Anthony, 1924

Synonyms
- Artibeus jamaicensis fraterculus Cabrera, 1958

= Fraternal fruit-eating bat =

Species of bat from South America

The fraternal fruit-eating bat (Artibeus fraterculus) is a species of bat in the family Phyllostomidae that is found in drier habitats in Ecuador and Peru. It was formerly considered to be a subspecies of the Jamaican fruit bat, but was raised to species level in 1978. The smallest species in the group of large Artibeus (a group that also includes the Jamaican fruit bat, flat-faced fruit-eating bat, and great fruit-eating bat), it has a forearm length of 52–59 mm (2.0–2.3 in), a total length of 64–76 mm (2.5–3.0 in), and a weight of 30–55 g (1.1–1.9 oz).

It is a generalist frugivore, feeding on a variety of fruit and supplementing its diet with insects. It breeds in both the wet and dry season, with parturition (birth of young) peaking in February and May. The only known predator is the barn owl, although it may also be hunted by other birds of prey and the spectral bat. It is parasitized by species of streblid bat flies, mites, and protozoans.

The fraternal fruit-eating bat is listed as being a species of least concern by the International Union for Conservation of Nature (IUCN) on the IUCN Red List due to its commonness, large range, and lack of significant population declines. However, it may be threatened by heavy metal poisoning in some areas.

== Taxonomy and systematics ==
The fraternal fruit-eating bat was first described in 1924 by Harold Elmer Anthony on the basis of a specimen collected at an altitude of 2,000 ft (610 m) in Portovelo, el Oro, Ecuador. It was subsequently considered a subspecies of Jamaican fruit bat (Artibeus jamaicensis), until it was raised to species level again by Karl Koopman in 1978 on the basis of morphological data.

The generic name Artibeus is from the Greek arti, meaning straight, and bao, meaning to walk. The specific name fraterculus means "little brother" in Modern Latin, referring to the fact that the fraternal fruit-eating bat is the smallest species in the group of large Artibeus. In English, the species is also known as the western artibeus, while it is known as the murciélago frutero fraternal or murciélago frutero del suroccidente in Spanish.

The fraternal fruit-eating bat is one of 12 species in the genus Artibeus. Within the genus, it was historically considered to be part of the Jamaican fruit bat complex. Instead, studies of mitochondrial DNA have shown that it is sister to the hairy fruit-eating bat, and these two species form a sister clade to the Honduran fruit-eating bat. It diverged from other species around 2.3 million years ago, after the closure of the Panamian land bridge. The species is considered to be representative of a historical connection between bats on the west Andean slope and Middle America, as it is most closely related to species that are now restricted to Middle America.

== Description ==
The fraternal fruit-eating bat is the smallest species of large Artibeus (a group that also includes the Jamaican fruit bat, flat-faced fruit-eating bat, and great fruit-eating bat), with a forearm length of 52–59 mm (2.0–2.3 in) and total length of 64–76 mm (2.5–3.0 in). Adults weigh 30–55 g (1.1–1.9 oz). It is the palest South American Artibeus, and is similar in appearance to Anderson's fruit-eating bat, but smaller. It occurs in both grayish-brown and yellowish-brown color morphs. It has soft velvety fur, which is short on the back. The dorsal fur is dark gray to dark brown. The fur on the underside is pale and appears frosted due to the silvery-gray tip of each hair.

The head is large with a relatively big snout and a large, well-developed, and elliptical noseleaf with a free horseshoe. The ears and noseleaf, along with the skin membrane on the forearm, tibia, metacarpals, and phalanges are pale brown, contrasting with the dark blackish patagium (wing membrane). The tragus (a projection in front of the ear) is gray to dark gray, while the feet and uropatagium (tail membrane) are dark brown. The propatagium extends to the first thumb phalanx, while the wing membrane extends to the base of the thumbs. The tail membrane has a slightly hairy central notch and the tail is absent. The dental formula is 2.1.2.22.1.2.3, with a total of 30 teeth.

The fraternal fruit-eating bat's facial lines are faint and hardly visible, and some individuals have lower stripes that are unnoticeable. Contrastingly, Anderson's fruit bats have thin, clearly visible facial lines, while the great fruit-eating bat has prominent facial lines. The flat-faced fruit-eating bat also has conspicuous facial lines.

== Ecology ==
=== Diet ===
The fraternal fruit-eating bat is mainly a frugivore, feeding on a wide variety of fruit such as Ficus figs, mangoes, loquats, Brosimum alicastrum, Muntingia calabura, Psidium guajava, Syzygium jambos, Iochroma arborescens, Solanum crinitipes, Styrax subargentea, Cecropia obtusifolia, and Cecropia polystachya. It also supplements its diet with insects.

=== Breeding ===
The fraternal fruit-eating bat is a seasonal breeder which breeds twice a year in both the wet and dry season. Although it gives birth in both seasons, it peaks during February and May. Pregnant females have also been reported in October and November, while lactating females have been reported in July and November. During the dry season, males with descended gonads and females with developed nipples have been reported in September.

=== Predation ===
The only known predator of the fraternal fruit-eating bat is the barn owl. However, it may also be predated by other species of owls and the bat falcon. Another possible predator is the spectral bat.

=== Parasites ===
The fraternal fruit-eating bat is parasitized by the streblid bat flies Aspidoptera phyllostomatis, Megistopoda aranea, Metelasmus pseudopterus, Speiseria ambigua, Strebla guajiro, and Trichobius joblingi and the mite Periglischrus iheringi. It is also parasitized by the protozoan Trypanosoma cruzi.

=== Echolocation ===
The starting frequency of echolocation calls is 89.45–103.99 kHz and the ending frequency is 59.18–84.09 kHz, with a duration of 1.61 milliseconds.

== Distribution and habitat ==
The fraternal fruit-eating bat is found in Peru and Ecuador. In Peru, it is found west of the Andes in the Tumbes, Piura, Lambayeque, and Ica departments and in arid parts of the Amazon Basin in the Cajamarca and Amazonas departments. In Ecuador, it is found in the central and southern coastal areas, and in the southwestern foothills of the Andes.

It inhabits forests, disturbed habitats, and agricultural and urban areas. It is most frequently found in mangrove forests, arid scrubland, and deciduous and semideciduous forests. It is also uncommonly found in wetter habitats. It has been recorded in humid montane scrub in Loja, Ecuador. It occurs at elevations between 0–2,145 m (0–7,037 ft).

Throughout most of its range, the fraternal fruit-eating bat is sympatric with Anderson's fruit-eating bat and the great fruit-eating bat. It also co-occurs with many other species of bats, including endemics in the Tumbesian Center of Endemism, a region of the Andes with a proportion of endemic species. It roosts in hollow trees, shrubs, caves, termite mounds, bridges, churches, houses, gardens, and mines. The number of individuals roosting together can range from nine to hundreds of bats.

== Status ==
The fraternal fruit-eating bat is listed as being a species of least concern by the International Union for Conservation of Nature (IUCN) on the IUCN Red List due to its large range, commonness, and lack of significant population decline. It does not face major threats throughout its range. However, urban populations from Guayaquil in Ecuador have been found to have elevated levels of lead in their vital organs, and heavy metal poisoning may be a localized threat to the species.
