= Bat influenza =

Viral disease afflicting bats

Bat influenza is a type of influenza A viruses found in bats. Bats were not considered to host Influenza A viruses until 2012–2013, when two phylogenetically distinct lineages, designated Influenza A virus subtype H17N10 and H18N11, were identified in Central and South American bats.

== Discovery ==
The species of bats known to carry bat influenza are common in Central and South America. The first bat flu virus, IAV H17N10, was first discovered in 2009 in little yellow-shouldered bats (Sturnira lilium) in Guatemala. In 2012 a novel influenza virus (H18N11) was discovered in bats in South America. This strain was found to be divergent from the better-understood Influenza A viruses most commonly found in fowls and humans. The complete sequence of IAV H17N10 was extracted from little yellow-shouldered bats in 2012. In 2013, the sequence of IAV H18N11 was extracted from flat-faced fruit-eating bats (Artibeus planirostris) from Peru. In contrast to human and avian influenza A viruses that use sialic acid receptors, the bat flu strains H17N10 and H18N11 infect cells by using major histocompatibility complex class II molecules on the host cell surface. Consequently, it was demonstrated that these viruses primarily infect immune cells, such as macrophages and dendritic cells, that express high levels of MHC-II.

== Other species ==
Influenza A viruses circulate among a wide variety of species, being able to cross species barriers and establish new virus lineages in birds and mammals. However, bat influenza viruses of the H18N11 subtype have been found to be poorly adapted to non-bat species.

== Infection in humans ==
As of 2019, no cases of influenza in humans have been definitively linked to bats. Research suggests that human cells do not support growth of bat flu viruses in the test tube, implying that these viruses would need to undergo significant changes to adapt and easily infect humans. However, a transmission potential has been found, but the mechanism of transmission from bats to humans differs from that from other species. It has been argued that bat flu viruses could become capable of infecting humans by exchanging genetic information with human flu viruses through reassortment.
