= Sceloenopla roseicollis =

Scientific classification
- Kingdom: Animalia
- Phylum: Arthropoda
- Class: Insecta
- Order: Coleoptera
- Suborder: Polyphaga
- Infraorder: Cucujiformia
- Family: Chrysomelidae
- Genus: Sceloenopla
- Species: S. roseicollis

Binomial name
- Sceloenopla roseicollis Spaeth, 1958

Species of beetle

Sceloenopla roseicollis is a species of beetle of the family Chrysomelidae. It is found in Brazil.

== Life history ==
The recorded host plants for this species are Pourouma species.
