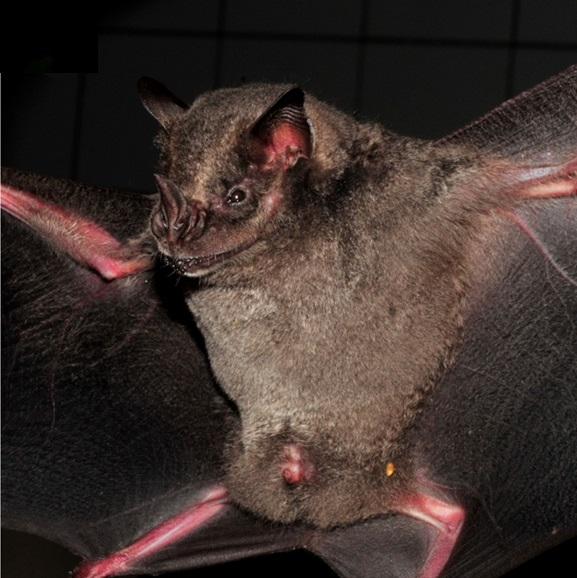

Conservation status
- Least Concern (IUCN 3.1)

Scientific classification
- Kingdom: Animalia
- Phylum: Chordata
- Class: Mammalia
- Order: Chiroptera
- Family: Phyllostomidae
- Genus: Artibeus
- Species: A. obscurus

Binomial name
- Artibeus obscurus Wied-Neuwied, 1826
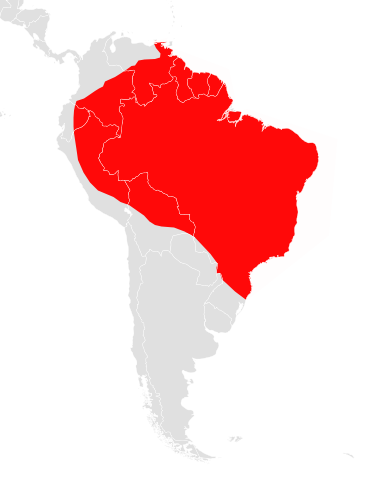
- Dark Fruit-eating Bat range

Synonyms
- Artibeus fuliginosus Artibeus jamaicensis fuliginosus

= Dark fruit-eating bat =

Species of bat

The dark fruit-eating bat (Artibeus obscurus), is a bat species from South America.

== Description ==
Dark fruit-eating bats are relatively small, with an average body length of 8 cm (3.1 in), and weighing from 30 to 52 g (1.1 to 1.8 oz). Their fur is longer and darker than that of their closest relatives, being dark brown to sooty black over most of the body, with a white frosting. The underparts are paler, and there are also faint stripes of pale fur on the face. The nose-leaf is broad, with a distinct horseshoe separated from the upper lip. The snout is relatively narrow for a bat of its small size, and the ears are rounded, with a sharply pointed tragus.

== Distribution and habitat ==
Dark-fruit eating bats are found throughout the Amazon Basin. They are known from all but the southernmost parts of Brazil, from the Guyanas, and from the Amazonian regions of countries from Venezuela to Bolivia. They inhabit rainforests from sea level to 1,400 m (4,600 ft), and, in the southern part of their range, savannah and patchy semi-deciduous forests. There are no recognised subspecies.

== Biology ==
The bats are generally low-flying, travelling close to the ground through forested terrain. They spend the day roosting under leaves or flaking pieces of bark about 4 to 7 m (13 to 23 ft) above the ground. They feed on figs, and the fruit of trees such as shimbillo and uvilla. Mating takes place between September and November, and results in the birth of a single offspring.

== Gallery ==
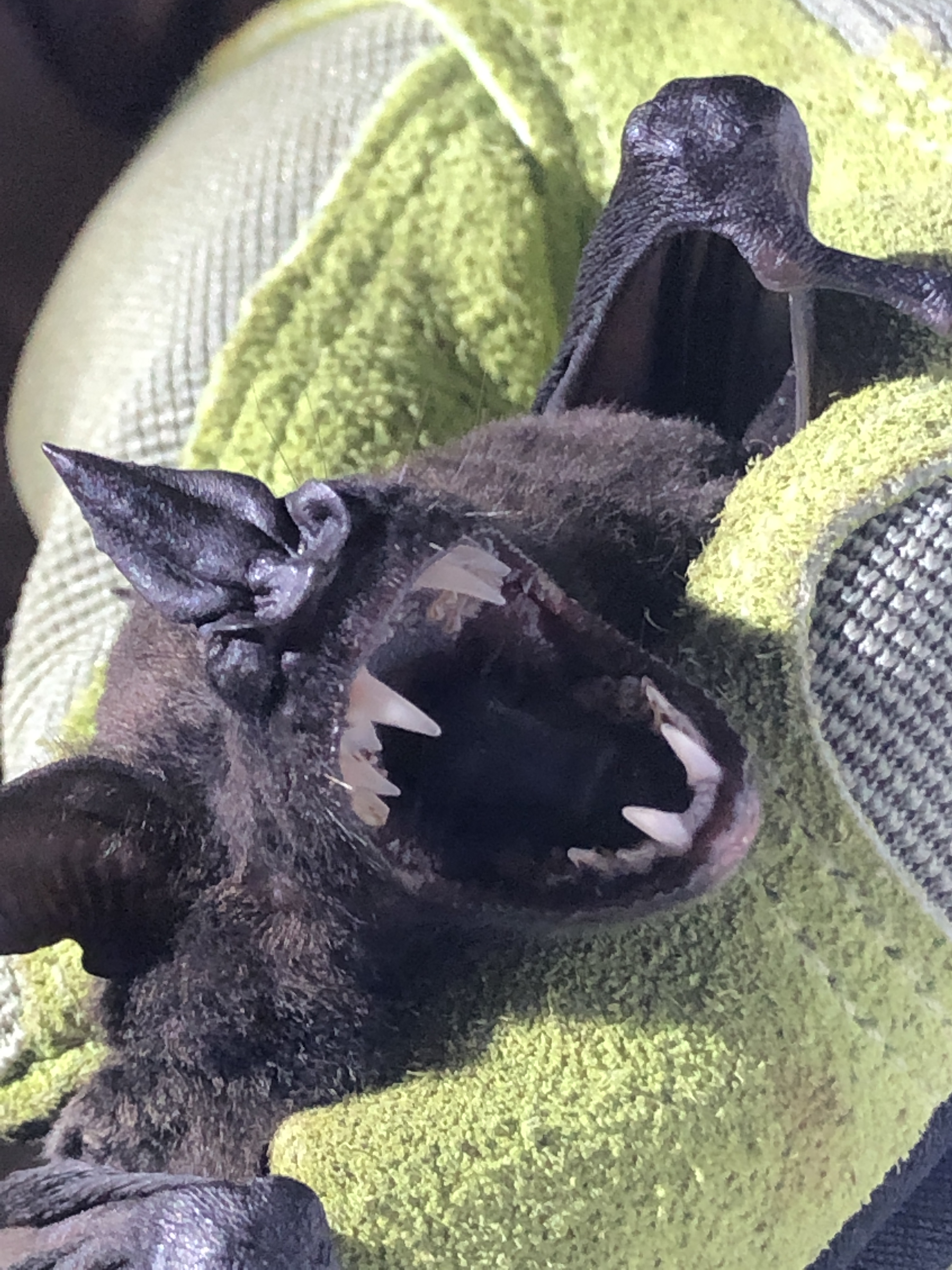
Artibeus obscurus and its teeth

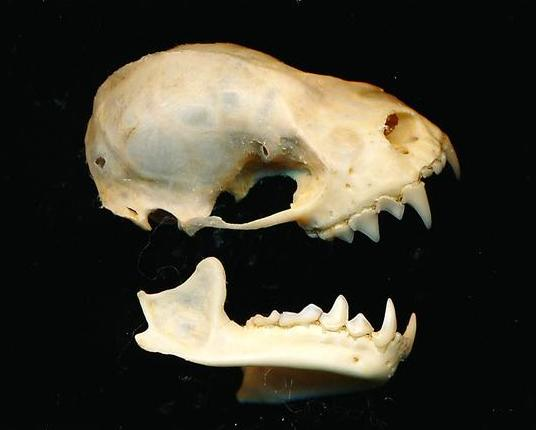
Artibeus obscurus skull

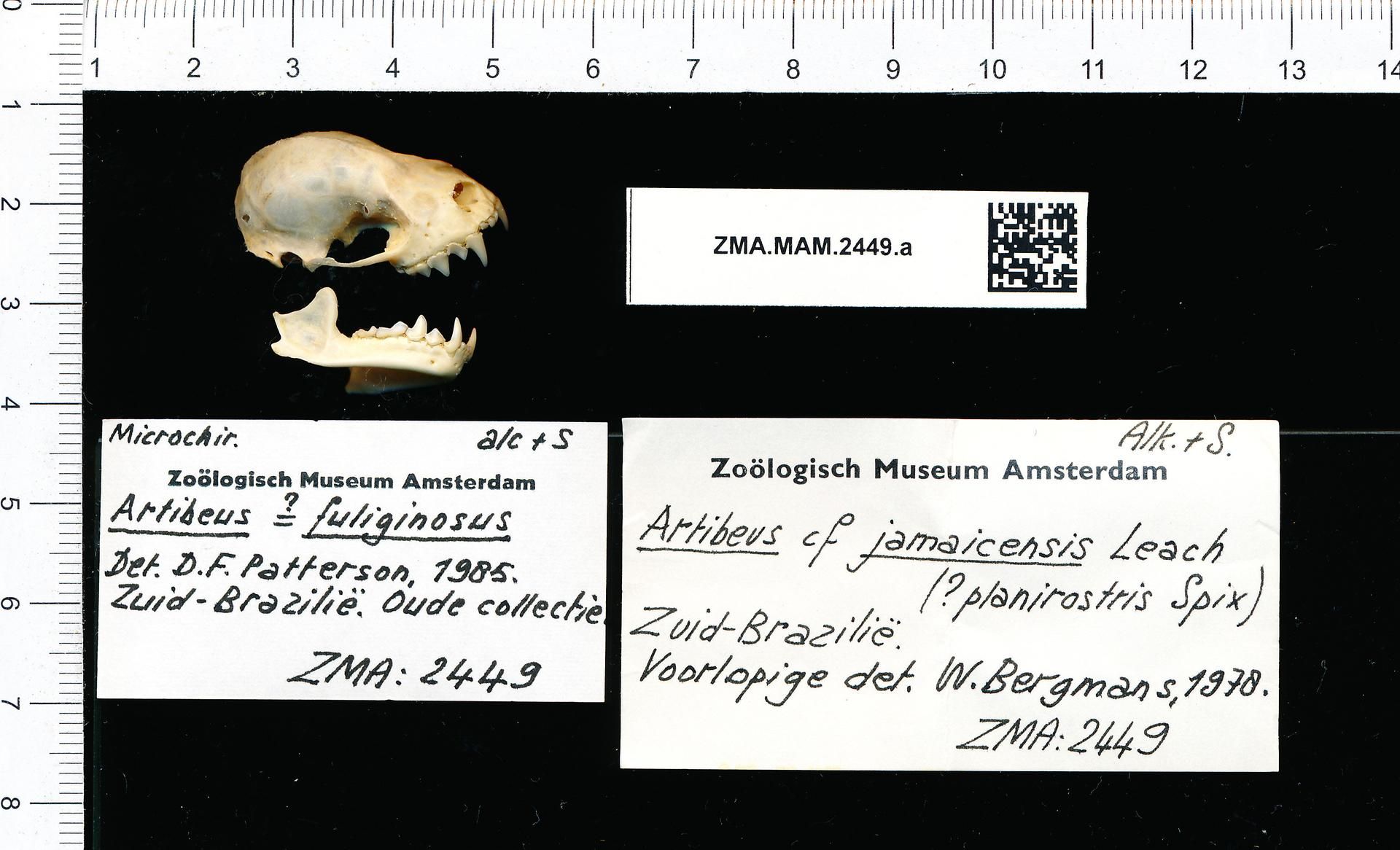

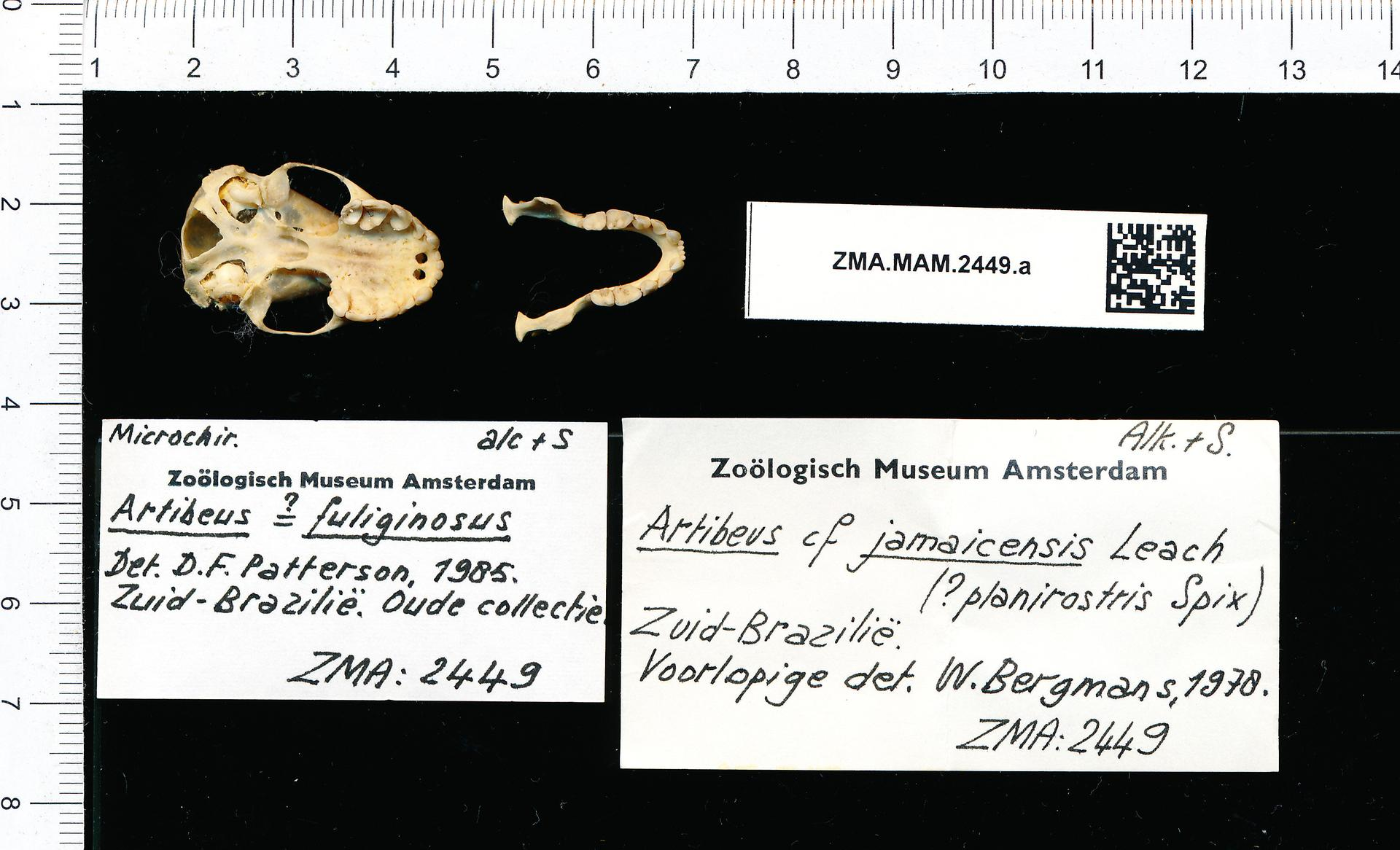
