= Malocampa piratica =

Scientific classification
- Kingdom: Animalia
- Phylum: Arthropoda
- Clade: Pancrustacea
- Class: Insecta
- Order: Lepidoptera
- Superfamily: Noctuoidea
- Family: Notodontidae
- Genus: Malocampa
- Species: M. piratica

Binomial name
- Malocampa piratica Schaus, 1906

Species of moth

Malocampa piratica is a moth of the family Notodontidae. It is found in Costa Rica. However, a specimen was found in Guatemala.

The larvae feed on Cecropia, Coussapoa and Pourouma species.
