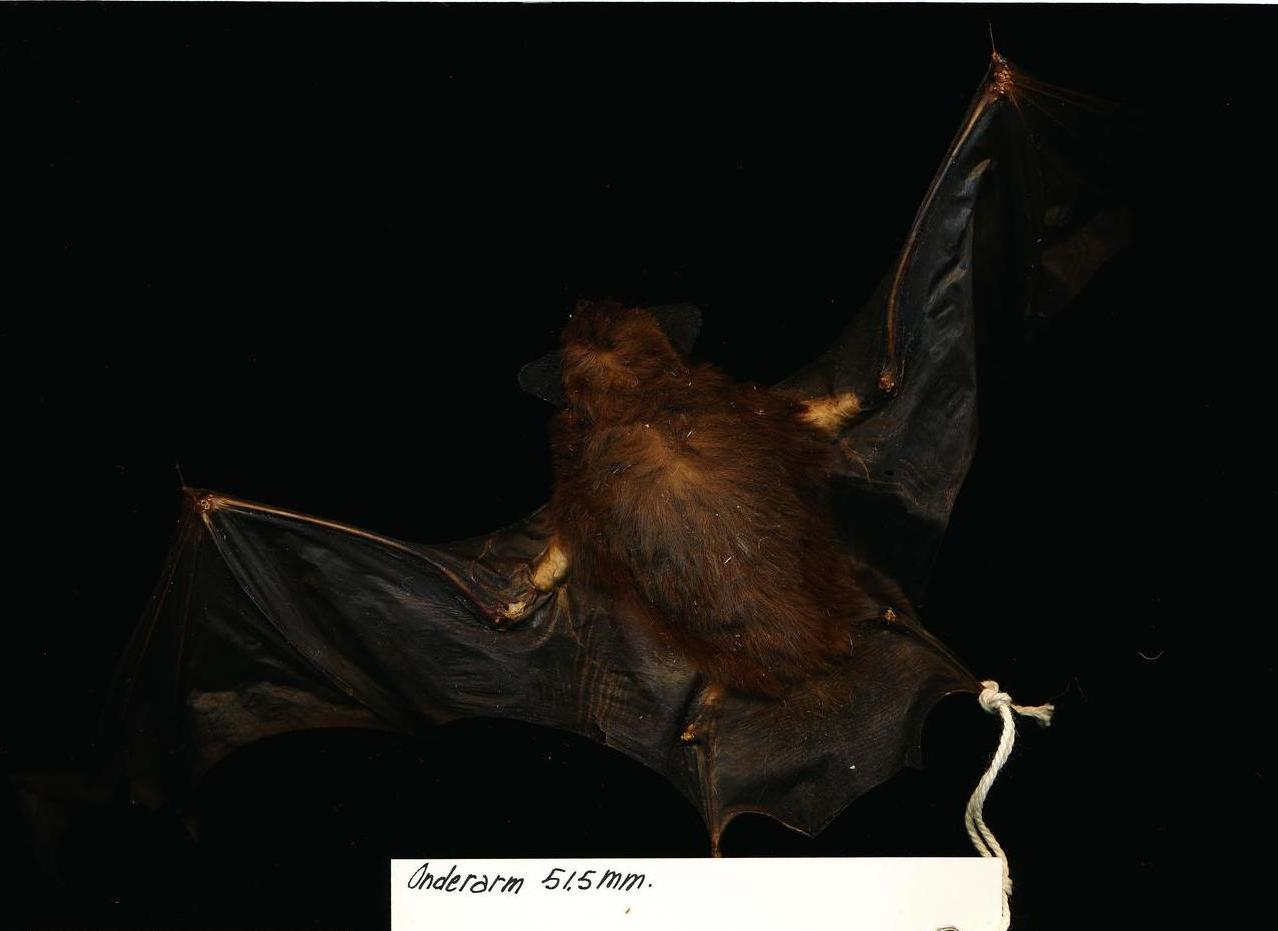

Conservation status
- Least Concern (IUCN 3.1)

Scientific classification
- Kingdom: Animalia
- Phylum: Chordata
- Class: Mammalia
- Order: Chiroptera
- Family: Emballonuridae
- Genus: Peropteryx
- Species: P. kappleri

Binomial name
- Peropteryx kappleri Peters, 1867
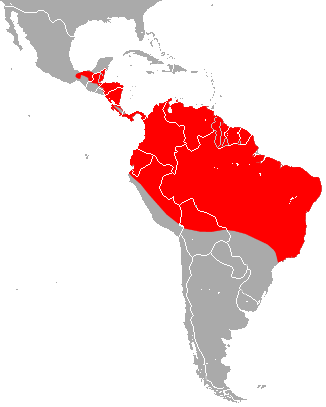
- Greater dog-like bat range

= Greater dog-like bat =

Species of bat

The greater dog-like bat (Peropteryx kappleri) is a bat species found from southern Mexico through Brazil and Peru.

== Description ==
It is the largest member of its genus, with a forearm length of 45–53.6 mm (1.77–2.11 in). Individuals weigh approximately 8 g (0.28 oz). Fur color can vary, with some individuals dark brown and others light brown. The ventral fur is paler than the dorsal fur. It has large black ears. Its dental formula is 1.1.2.33.1.2.3 for a total of 32 teeth.
