= Artibeus anthonyi =

Artibeus anthonyi Temporal range: Late Quaternary

Scientific classification
- Domain: Eukaryota
- Kingdom: Animalia
- Phylum: Chordata
- Class: Mammalia
- Order: Chiroptera
- Family: Phyllostomidae
- Genus: Artibeus
- Species: †A. anthonyi

Binomial name
- †Artibeus anthonyi (Woloszyn & Silva Taboda, 1977)

Extinct species of bat

Artibeus anthonyi, also known as Anthony's fruit-eating bat, is an extinct species of bat from the Late Quaternary of Cuba.

Anthony's fruit-eating bat shows the greatest morphological divergence compared with extant Artibeus species.
