= Malocampa puella =

Scientific classification
- Kingdom: Animalia
- Phylum: Arthropoda
- Clade: Pancrustacea
- Class: Insecta
- Order: Lepidoptera
- Superfamily: Noctuoidea
- Family: Notodontidae
- Genus: Malocampa
- Species: M. puella

Binomial name
- Malocampa puella Dyar, 1908

Species of moth

Malocampa puella is a moth of the family Notodontidae. It is found in Central America.
