= Malocampa bolivari =

Scientific classification
- Kingdom: Animalia
- Phylum: Arthropoda
- Clade: Pancrustacea
- Class: Insecta
- Order: Lepidoptera
- Superfamily: Noctuoidea
- Family: Notodontidae
- Genus: Malocampa
- Species: M. bolivari

Binomial name
- Malocampa bolivari (Schaus, 1894)

Synonyms
- Blera bolivari Schaus, 1894

Species of moth

Malocampa bolivari is a moth of the family Notodontidae. It is found in Venezuela.
