= Pourouma petiolulata =

Conservation status
- Near Threatened (IUCN 3.1)

Scientific classification
- Kingdom: Plantae
- Clade: Tracheophytes
- Clade: Angiosperms
- Clade: Eudicots
- Clade: Rosids
- Order: Rosales
- Family: Urticaceae
- Genus: Pourouma
- Species: P. petiolulata

Binomial name
- Pourouma petiolulata C.C.Berg

Species of flowering plant

Pourouma petiolulata is a species of flowering plant in the genus Pourouma. It is endemic to Ecuador. Its natural habitat is subtropical or tropical moist lowland forests. It is threatened by habitat loss.
