= Pourouma oraria =

Conservation status
- Vulnerable (IUCN 2.3)

Scientific classification
- Kingdom: Plantae
- Clade: Tracheophytes
- Clade: Angiosperms
- Clade: Eudicots
- Clade: Rosids
- Order: Rosales
- Family: Urticaceae
- Genus: Pourouma
- Species: P. oraria

Binomial name
- Pourouma oraria Standl. & Cuatr.

Species of tree

Pourouma oraria is a species of flowering plant in the genus Pourouma. It is found in Colombia, Panama, and Peru. It is threatened by habitat loss.
