= White-winged dog-like bat =

Conservation status
- Least Concern (IUCN 3.1)

Scientific classification
- Kingdom: Animalia
- Phylum: Chordata
- Class: Mammalia
- Order: Chiroptera
- Family: Emballonuridae
- Genus: Peropteryx
- Species: P. leucoptera

Binomial name
- Peropteryx leucoptera Peters, 1867
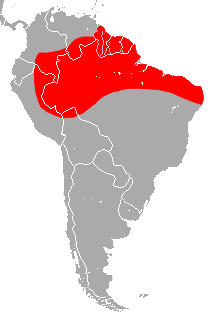
- White-winged dog-like bat range

Species of bat

The white-winged dog-like bat (Peropteryx leucoptera) is a bat species found in northern Brazil, southeastern Colombia, Ecuador, French Guiana, Guyana, eastern Peru, Suriname, and Venezuela.
