= Artibeus schwartzi =

Conservation status
- Data Deficient (IUCN 3.1)

Scientific classification
- Kingdom: Animalia
- Phylum: Chordata
- Class: Mammalia
- Order: Chiroptera
- Family: Phyllostomidae
- Genus: Artibeus
- Species: A. schwartzi

Binomial name
- Artibeus schwartzi Jones, 1978

Synonyms
- Artibeus jamaicensis schwartzi Jones, 1978

Species of bat

Artibeus schwartzi, or Schwartz's fruit-eating bat, is a species of bat found in the Lesser Antilles. It was previously considered a subspecies of the Jamaican fruit bat, (A. jamaicensis). It has been hypothesized that it arose from hybridization of three Artibeus species: A. jamaicensis, A. planirostris, and an unknown third species.

== Taxonomy and etymology ==
A. schwartzi was described as a new subspecies of the Jamaican fruit bat in 1978. In 2007, however, Larsen et al. determined that A. schwartzi should be recognized as a full species based on genetic data. The eponym for the species name "schwartzi" is in honour of American biologist Albert Schwartz.

== Biology and ecology ==
It is likely frugivorous.

== Range and habitat ==
It is endemic to the Lesser Antilles of the Caribbean Sea. Its range includes Barbados, Grenada, Montserrat, Saint Kitts and Nevis, Saint Lucia, Saint Vincent and the Grenadines, and Trinidad and Tobago. It has been documented at elevations up to 120 m (390 ft) above sea level.

== Conservation ==
As of 2016, it is assessed as a data deficient species by the IUCN. Very little is known about this species, and its population size and trend are unknown.
