= Malocampa =

Scientific classification
- Kingdom: Animalia
- Phylum: Arthropoda
- Clade: Pancrustacea
- Class: Insecta
- Order: Lepidoptera
- Superfamily: Noctuoidea
- Family: Notodontidae
- Subfamily: Heterocampinae
- Genus: Malocampa; Schaus, 1901

Genus of moths

Malocampa is a genus of moths of the family Notodontidae.

== Selected species ==
- Malocampa bolivari (Schaus, 1894)
- Malocampa confusa Thiaucourt & Miller, 2011
- Malocampa piratica Schaus, 1906
- Malocampa puella Dyar, 1908
- Malocampa punctata (Stoll, 1780)
