= Portovelo =

Portovelo Curipamba Curipamba
- Town
- Location within Ecuador
- Coordinates: 3.71644°S 79.61882°W
- Country: Ecuador
- Province: El Oro Province
- Canton: Portovelo Curipamba Canton

Government
  - Mayor: Segundo Orellana

Area
  - Town: 2.13 km^{2} (0.82 sq mi)
- Elevation: 600 m (2,000 ft)

Population (2022 census)
  - Town: 9,764
  - Density: 4,580/km^{2} (11,900/sq mi)

Portovelo Curipamba is a town in the El Oro Province of Ecuador.
