= Malocampa confusa =

Scientific classification
- Kingdom: Animalia
- Phylum: Arthropoda
- Clade: Pancrustacea
- Class: Insecta
- Order: Lepidoptera
- Superfamily: Noctuoidea
- Family: Notodontidae
- Genus: Malocampa
- Species: M. confusa

Binomial name
- Malocampa confusa Thiaucourt & Miller, 2011

Species of moth

Malocampa confusa is a moth of the family Notodontidae. It is found in north-eastern Ecuador.

The length of the forewings is 21–25 mm.
