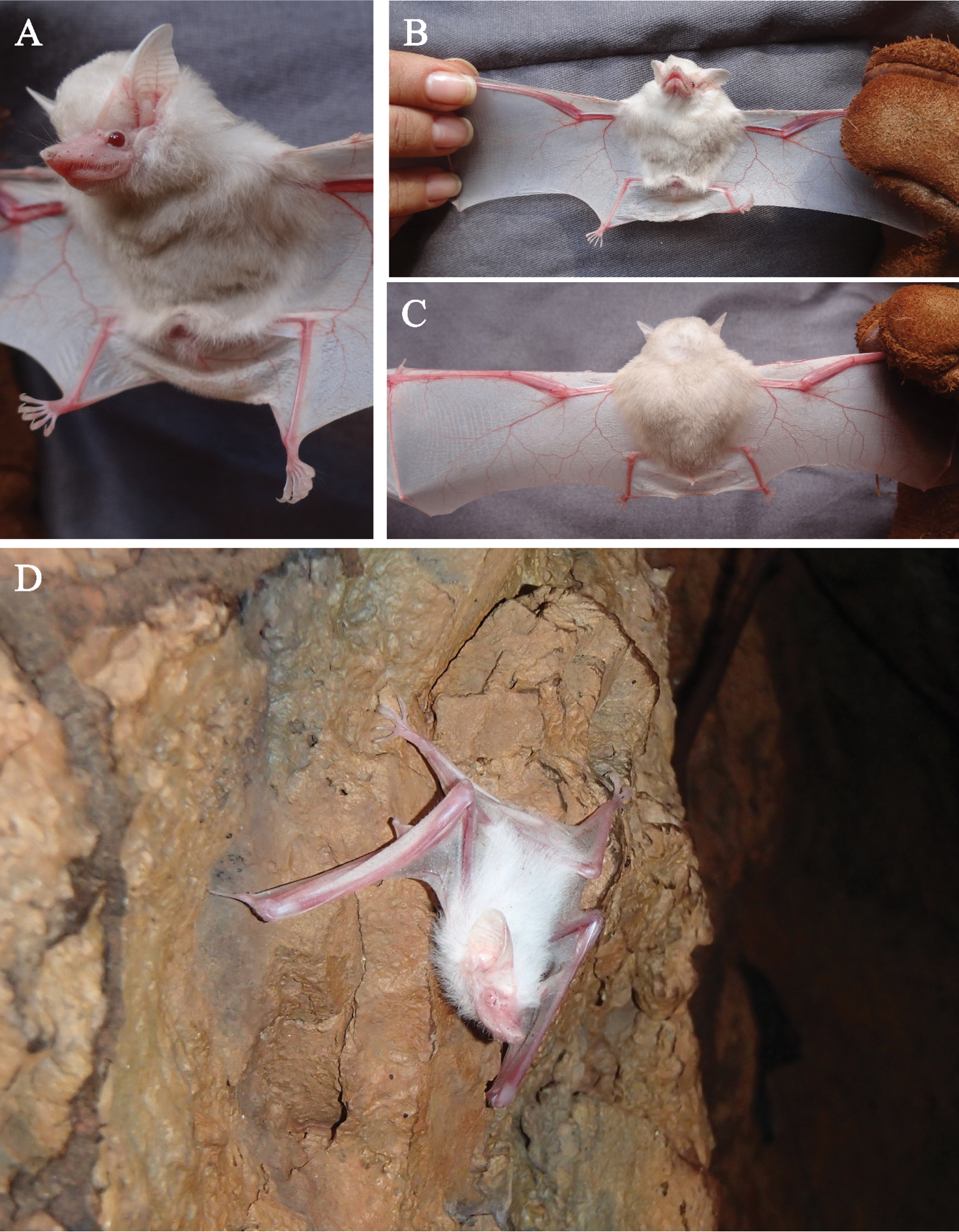
- Peropteryx kappleri

Scientific classification
- Kingdom: Animalia
- Phylum: Chordata
- Class: Mammalia
- Order: Chiroptera
- Family: Emballonuridae
- Genus: Peropteryx; Peters, 1867

Type species
- Vespertilio caninus Wied-Newied, 1821

Species
- Peropteryx kappleri Peropteryx leucoptera Peropteryx macrotis Peropteryx pallidoptera Peropteryx trinitatis

= Peropteryx =

Genus of bats

Peropteryx is a genus of 5 species of bat in the family Emballonuridae, namely:

- Greater dog-like bat (Peropteryx kappleri)
- White-winged dog-like bat (Peropteryx leucoptera)
- Lesser dog-like bat (Peropteryx macrotis)
- Pale-winged dog-like bat (Peropteryx pallidoptera)
- Trinidad dog-like bat (Peropteryx trinitatis)
