= Artibeus aequatorialis =

Conservation status
- Least Concern (IUCN 3.1)

Scientific classification
- Kingdom: Animalia
- Phylum: Chordata
- Class: Mammalia
- Order: Chiroptera
- Family: Phyllostomidae
- Genus: Artibeus
- Species: A. aequatorialis

Binomial name
- Artibeus aequatorialis Andersen, 1906

Synonyms
- Artibeus jamaicensis aequatorialis

Species of bat

Artibeus aequatorialis, also known as Anderson's fruit-eating bat or the Ecuadorian fruit-eating bat, is a species of bat in the family Phyllostomidae. The bat is endemic to northwestern South America west of the Andes mountain range.

== Taxonomy ==
It was previously considered a subspecies of the Jamaican fruit bat (A. jamaicensis). Larsen elevated it to species level on the basis of morphometric and genetic data.

== Habitat and distribution ==
The bat is found in Peru, Ecuador, and Colombia. It inhabits tropical dry forests and tropical lowland forests of the Chocó. It seems to be more common in humid forests. The northernmost and southernmost extent of its range are unknown.

== Conservation ==
The species has been assessed as least-concern by the IUCN due to its large range, and relative abundance.

The threats to this species are not known. However, it occurs in some nature reserves (private and national) in its range in western Ecuador. It also occurs in some national parks in Peru.
