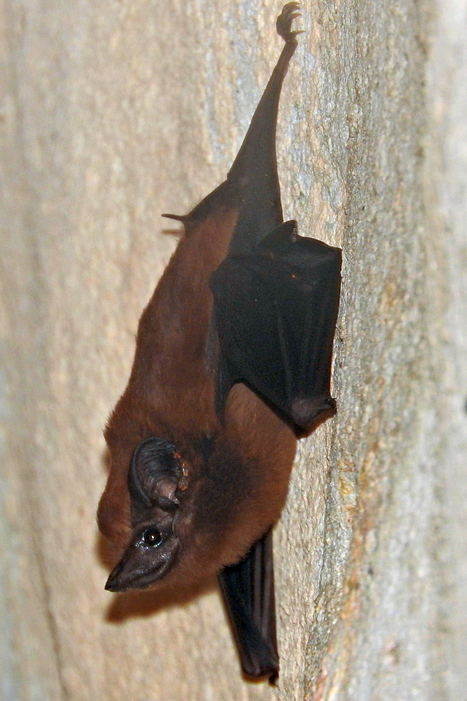

Conservation status
- Data Deficient (IUCN 3.1)

Scientific classification
- Domain: Eukaryota
- Kingdom: Animalia
- Phylum: Chordata
- Class: Mammalia
- Order: Chiroptera
- Family: Emballonuridae
- Genus: Peropteryx
- Species: P. trinitatis

Binomial name
- Peropteryx trinitatis Miller, 1899

Subspecies
- P.t. trinitatis P.t. phaea
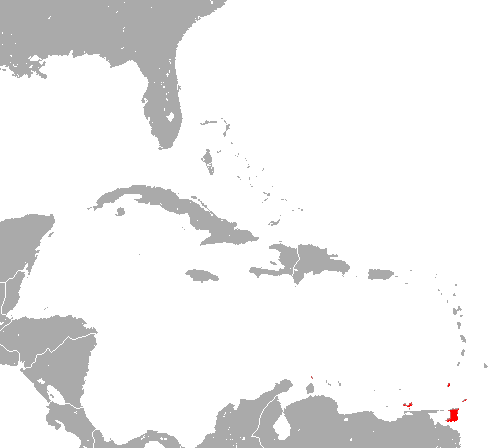
- Trinidad dog-like bat range as of 2011

= Trinidad dog-like bat =

Species of bat

The Trinidad dog-like bat (Peropteryx trinitatis) is a species of bat from the family Emballonuridae. It is native to Aruba, French Guiana, Grenada, Trinidad and Tobago, and Venezuela. The bat is considered to be rare everywhere in its geographic range, although this may be untrue, as the Trinidad dog-like bat was previously confused with the lesser dog-like bat. It is an aerial insectivore that roosts in hollow trees, hollow rotten logs on the ground, under overhanging banks, and caves in the Llanos of Venezuela.

The Trinidad dog-like bat has two subspecies: Peropteryx trinitatis trinitatis and Peropteryx trinitatis phaea.

== See also ==
- Lesser dog-like bat
