= Portovelo Canton =

- Canton
- Location of El Oro Province in Ecuador.

- Portovelo Canton in El Oro Province
- Coordinates: 3°43′12″S 79°37′12″W
- Country: Ecuador
- Province: El Oro Province

Area
  - Total: 284.2 km^{2} (109.7 sq mi)

Population (2022 census)
  - Total: 13,556
  - Density: 47.70/km^{2} (123.5/sq mi)
- Time zone: UTC-5 (ECT)

Portovelo Canton is a canton of Ecuador, located in the El Oro Province. Its capital is the town of Portovelo. Its population at the 2001 census was 11,024.

== Demographics ==
Ethnic groups as of the Ecuadorian census of 2010:

- Mestizo 69.7%
- Montubio 18.0%
- White 7.6%
- Afro-Ecuadorian 4.3%
- Indigenous 0.1%
- Other 0.2%
