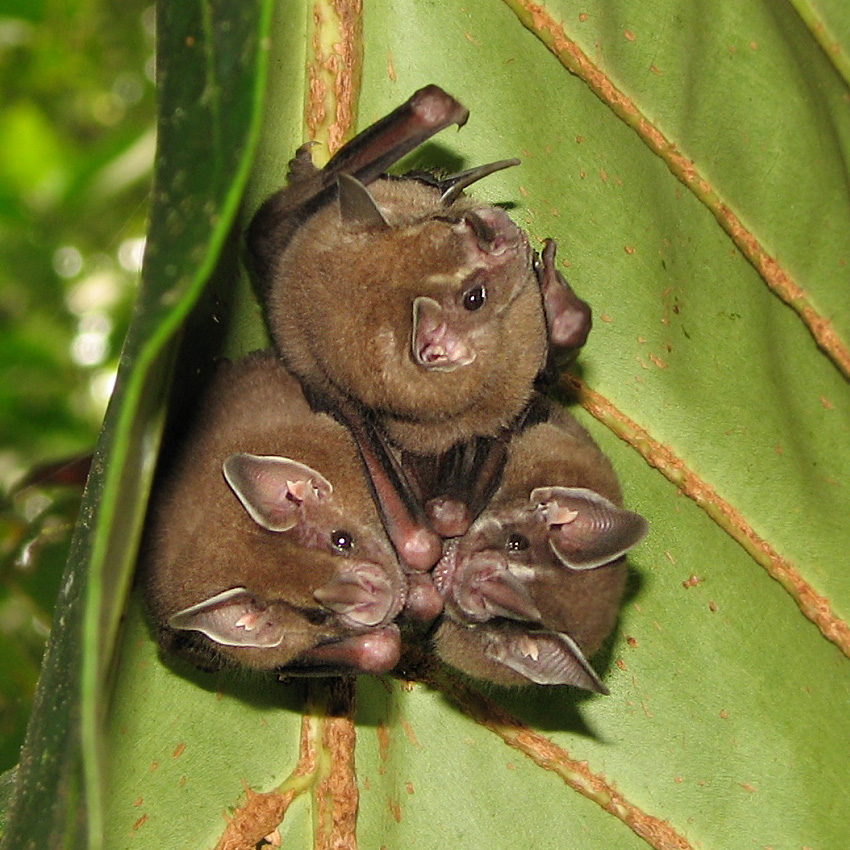
- Artibeus sp., Tortuguero National Park, Costa Rica

Scientific classification
- Domain: Eukaryota
- Kingdom: Animalia
- Phylum: Chordata
- Class: Mammalia
- Order: Chiroptera
- Family: Phyllostomidae
- Subfamily: Stenodermatinae
- Genus: Artibeus; Leach, 1821

Type species
- Artibeus jamaicensis Leach, 1821

Species
- Artibeus aequatorialis Artibeus amplus Artibeus concolor Artibeus fimbriatus Artibeus fraterculus Artibeus hirsutus Artibeus inopinatus Artibeus jamaicensis Artibeus lituratus Artibeus obscurus Artibeus planirostris Artibeus schwartzi †Artibeus anthonyi

= Artibeus =

Genus of bats

The Neotropical fruit bats (Artibeus) are a genus of bats within the subfamily Stenodermatinae. The genus consists of 12 species, which are native to Central and South America, as well as the Caribbean.

== Description ==
These bats grow to an average length of 5 to 10 cm, and a weight of 10 to 85 g. The fur is colored brown or gray on the top; the bottom side is brighter. In a few species, the faces have four light-colored stripes. The patagium, the skin between the legs, is very small, and they lack a tail – a general characteristic of the fruit bats. The ears are acuminated and like many other leaf-nosed bats the nose bears a small, sharp leaf which is used for echolocation.

== Geographical distribution and habitat ==
Neotropical fruit bats are found in the Neotropics from the north of Mexico and The Bahamas, to northern Argentina. They live in different natural habitats and can be found in both forests and grasslands.

== Diet, reproduction and social behaviour ==
Like most bats, Neotropical fruit bats are nocturnal. They sleep in caves, houses, or other hideouts. Some species use large leaves to form "tents", which provide shelter from the weather and hide them from predators. Most species live in large groups. Artibeus jamaicensis – the best studied species – forms groups, consisting of one to three males, three to 14 females, and the shared offspring.

The diet of these bats mainly consists of fruit, but they eat pollen and insects too.

Little is known about the reproduction of many species. A. jamaicensis has a gestation period of usually 112 to 120 days that can be extended up to 180 days due to dormancy. The offspring usually consists of one young, which is weaned after two months and becomes sexually mature at an age of eight to twelve months. Captured bats can live up to ten years.

== Taxonomy ==
The genus of the Neotropical fruit bats is divided into two sub-genera (Artibeus and Koopmania).

Genus Artibeus - Neotropical fruit bats

- Subgenus Artibeus
  - Ecuadorian fruit-eating bat, Artibeus aequatorialis from Ecuador, Peru and Colombia.
  - Large fruit-eating bat, Artibeus amplus lives in Colombia, Venezuela, and Guyana.
  - Fringed fruit-eating bat, Artibeus fimbriatus has its habitat in southern Brazil, in Paraguay and northern Argentina.
  - Fraternal fruit-eating bat, Artibeus fraterculus is only known in Ecuador and Peru.
  - Hairy fruit-eating bat, Artibeus hirsutus lives in western Mexico.
  - Honduran fruit-eating bat, Artibeus inopinatus is located in Central America (El Salvador, Nicaragua, and Honduras).
  - Jamaican fruit bat, Artibeus jamaicensis is the best known species. It is spread from The Bahamas and northern Mexico, through Central America and the Caribbean to northwestern Peru.
  - Great fruit-eating bat, Artibeus lituratus is spread from southern Mexico to northern Argentina.
  - Dark fruit-eating bat, Artibeus obscurus lives exclusively in the Amazon Basin.
  - Flat-faced fruit-eating bat, Artibeus planirostris is found in most of tropical South America east of the Andes.
  - Schwartz's fruit-eating bat, Artibeus schwartzi from the Lesser Antilles.
- Subgenus Koopmania
  - Brown fruit-eating bat, Artibeus concolor lives in the Amazon Basin.

=== Extinct species ===
- Anthony's fruit-eating bat, Artibeus anthonyi - Quaternary of Cuba
