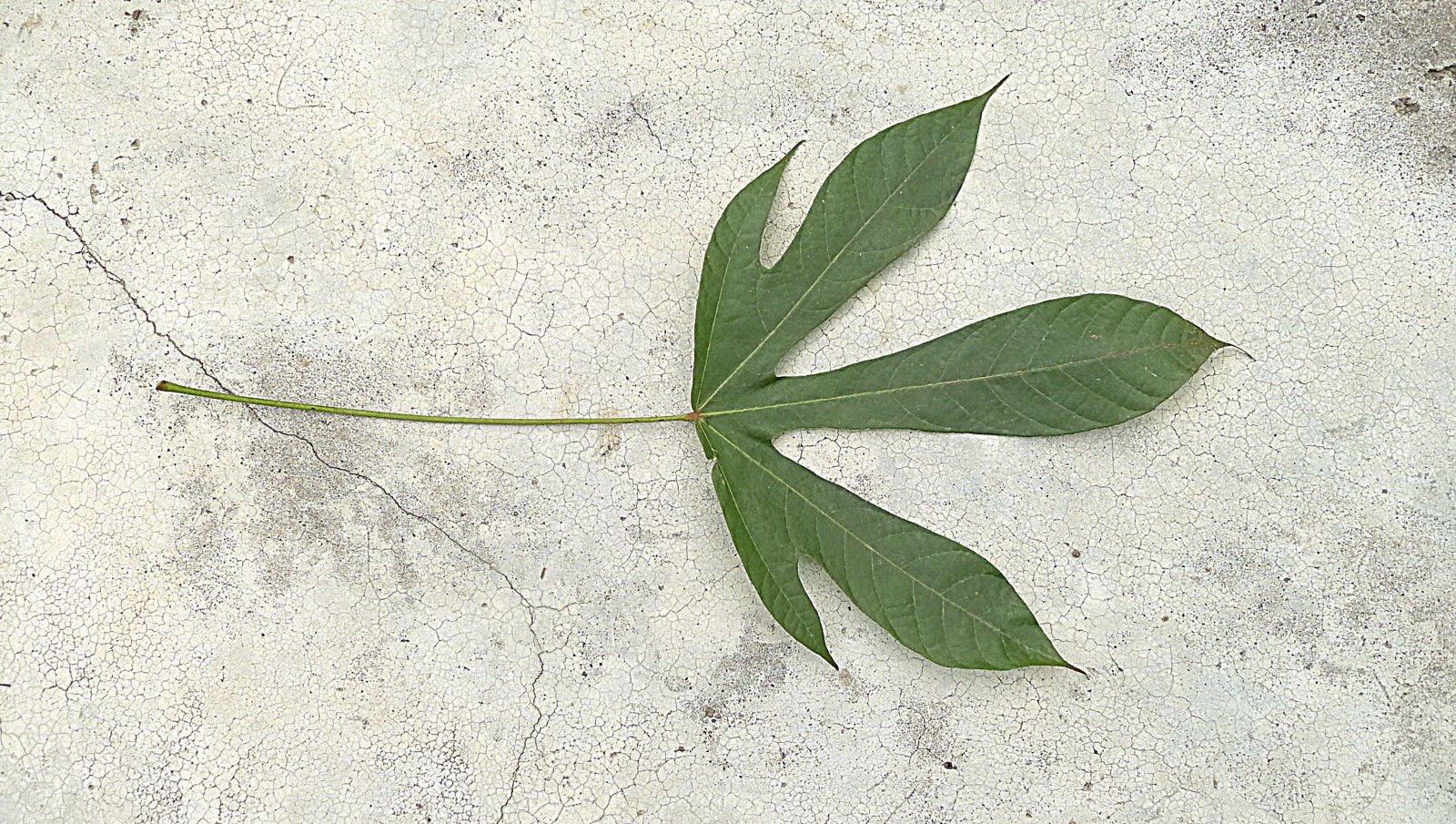
- Pourouma guianensis leaf

Scientific classification
- Kingdom: Plantae
- Clade: Tracheophytes
- Clade: Angiosperms
- Clade: Eudicots
- Clade: Rosids
- Order: Rosales
- Family: Urticaceae
- Tribe: Cecropieae
- Genus: Pourouma; Aubl.

Species
- See text

= Pourouma =

Genus of flowering plants

Pourouma is a genus of at least 20–25 species of flowering plants in the family Urticaceae, or alternately, the Cecropiaceae, native to tropical regions of Central and South America.

The species are trees growing to 20 m tall. The leaves are spirally arranged, palmately veined, with an entire margin. They are dioecious, with male and female flowers on separate trees. The fruit is fleshy.

Selected species

- Pourouma bicolor
- Pourouma bolivarensis
- Pourouma cecropiifolia — Amazon grape, mapati
- Pourouma cordata
- Pourouma montana
- Pourouma napoensis
- Pourouma oraria
- Pourouma petiolulata
- Pourouma saulensis
- Pourouma stipulacea
