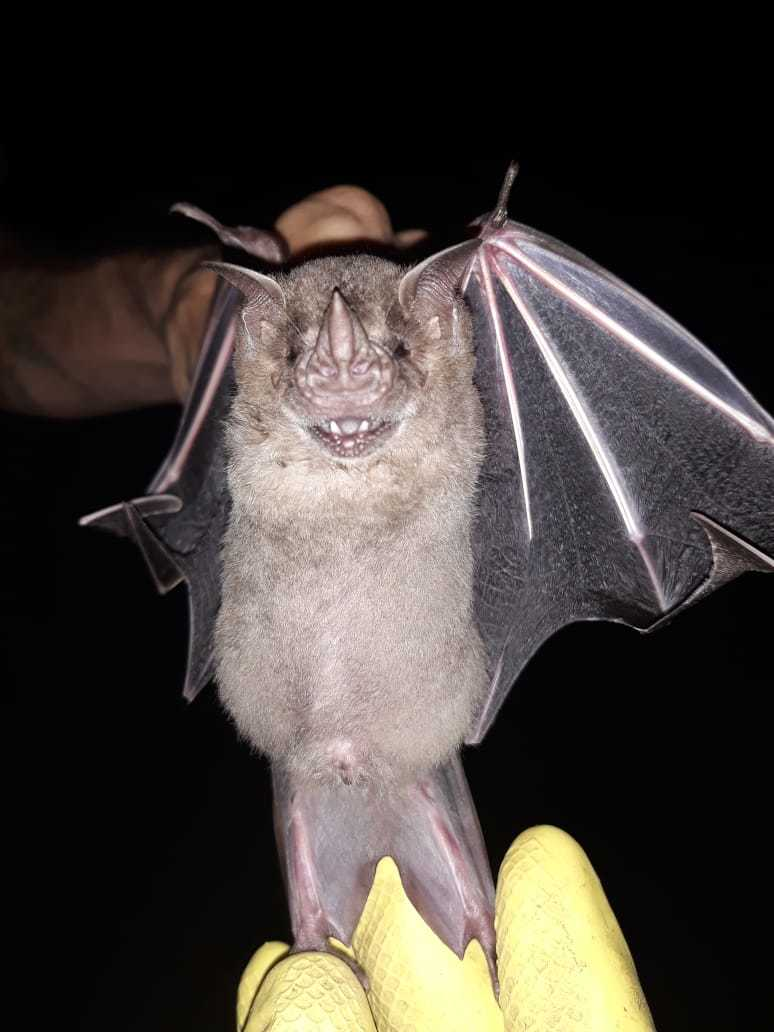

Conservation status
- Least Concern (IUCN 3.1)

Scientific classification
- Kingdom: Animalia
- Phylum: Chordata
- Class: Mammalia
- Order: Chiroptera
- Family: Phyllostomidae
- Genus: Artibeus
- Species: A. planirostris

Binomial name
- Artibeus planirostris (Spix, 1823)

Synonyms
- Artibeus jamaicensis planirostris

= Flat-faced fruit-eating bat =

Species of bat

The flat-faced fruit-eating bat (Artibeus planirostris) is a South American species of bat in the family Phyllostomidae. It is sometimes considered a subspecies of the Jamaican fruit bat, but can be distinguished by its larger size, the presence of faint stripes on the face, and of a third molar tooth on each side of the upper jaw. Genetic analysis has also shown that the two species may not be closely related.

== Description ==
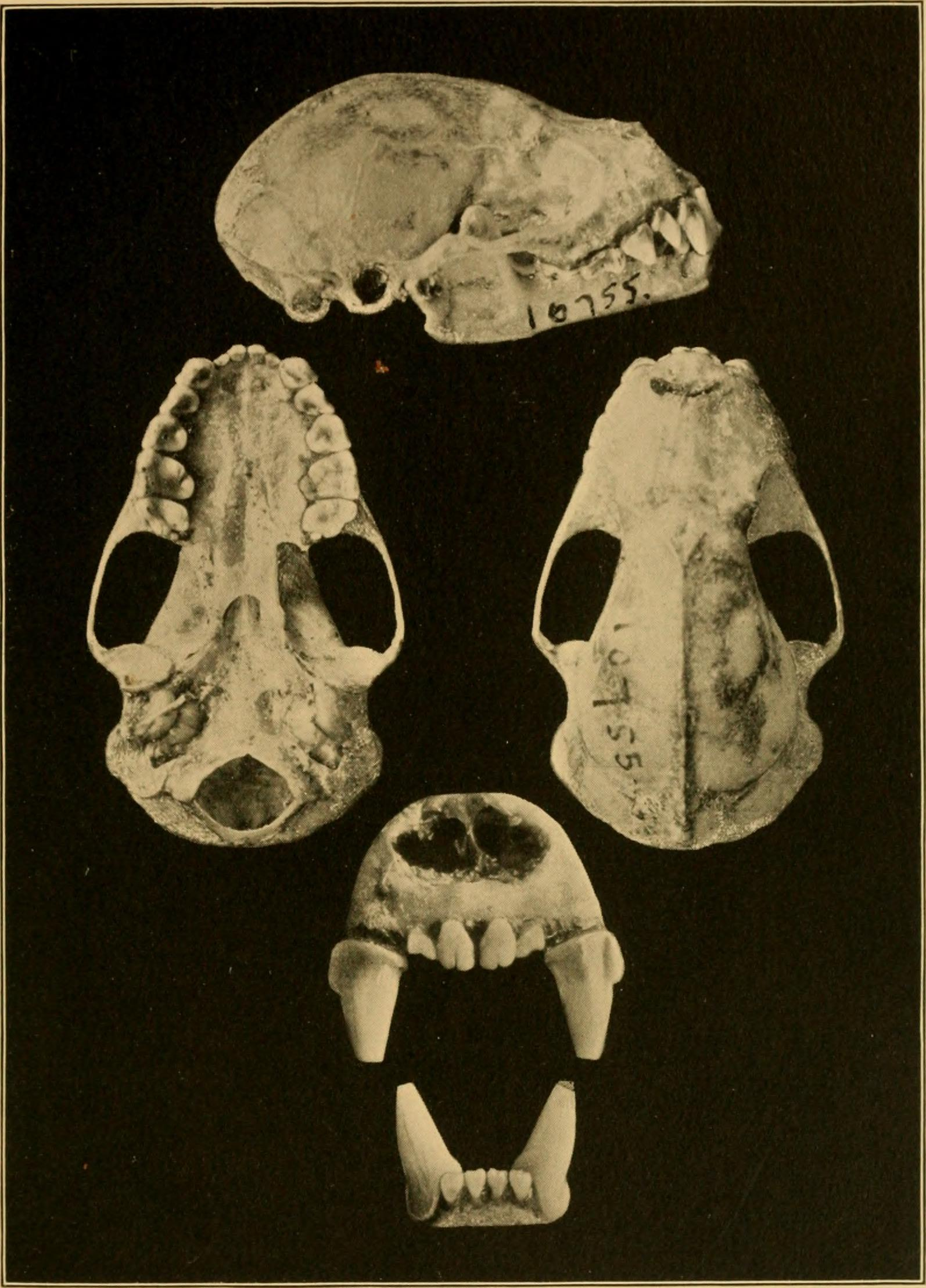
Skull

Flat-faced fruit-eating bats are moderately sized bats, with adults measuring 8 to 11 centimetres (3.1 to 4.3 in) in total length and weighing 40 to 69 grams (1.4 to 2.4 oz). The fur is brownish-grey over most of the body, becoming grey on the underparts, although there are faint whitish stripes on the face. As their name suggests, the bats have a broad skull with a short snout. The ears are triangular, with rounded tips, although short compared with those of many other bats, and with a small tragus. The snout bears a prominent triangular nose-leaf. The wings are dark brown or blackish, with white tips. A well-developed uropatagium stretches between the legs, but there is no visible tail.

== Distribution and habitat ==
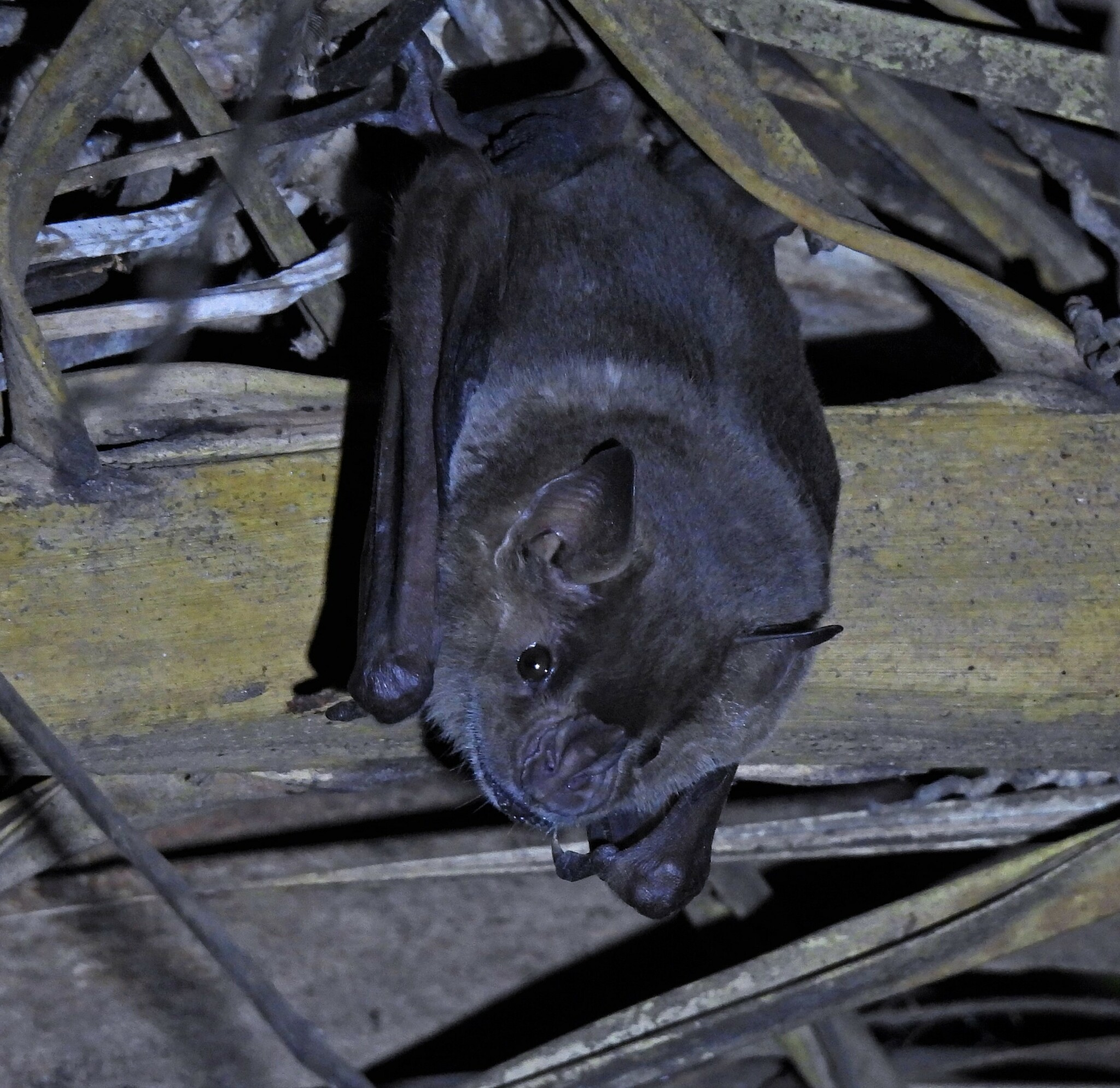
In Argentina

Flat-faced fruit-eating bats are found through much of northern and central South America east of the Andes. They inhabit a range of forested environments from sea level to 2,000 metres (6,600 ft) elevation, including montane, transitional, and lowland tropical forests and open cerrado habitats. Three subspecies are currently recognised:

- Artibeus planirostris planirostris - eastern Brazil, Paraguay
- Artibeus planirostris fallax - southern Venezuela and Colombia, the Guyanas, through central and western Brazil to eastern Bolivia and extreme northern Argentina
- Artibeus planirostris hercules - eastern Peru, eastern Ecuador

== Behaviour and biology ==
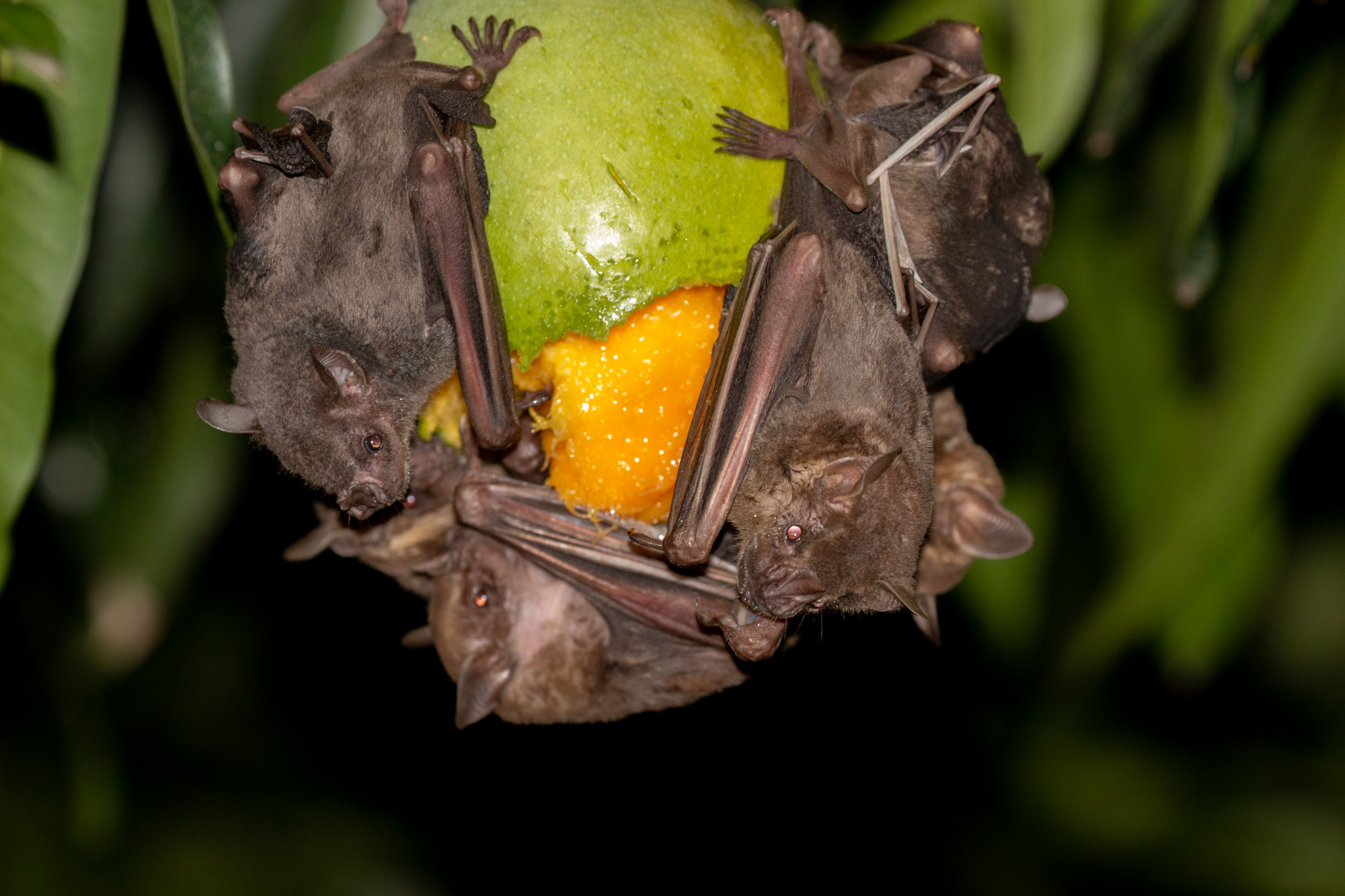
Feeding on a mango.

Flat-faced fruit-eating bats are nocturnal and herbivorous. They feed almost entirely on fruit, although they may also eat small quantities of insects and mites. They are active throughout the night, and spend the day roosting in trees. Favoured fruit include those of Vismia trees, figs, and Amazon grape. They are apparently capable of breeding throughout the year, although, in at least some areas, births are more common during the wet season. Gestation lasts at least three and a half months, and results in the birth of a single young.
