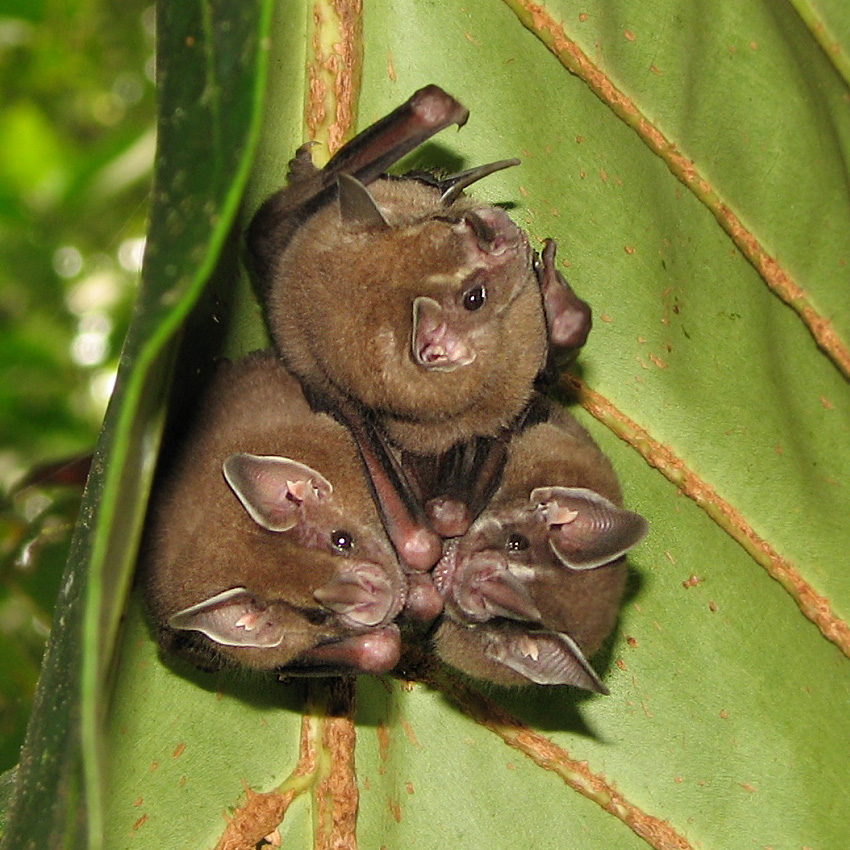

Conservation status
- Least Concern (IUCN 3.1)

Scientific classification
- Kingdom: Animalia
- Phylum: Chordata
- Class: Mammalia
- Infraclass: Placentalia
- Order: Chiroptera
- Family: Phyllostomidae
- Genus: Artibeus
- Species: A. jamaicensis

Binomial name
- Artibeus jamaicensis Leach, 1821
- Jamaican fruit bat range

= Jamaican fruit bat =

Species of bat

The Jamaican fruit bat (Artibeus jamaicensis) is a frugivorous bat species native to the Neotropics.

== Description ==
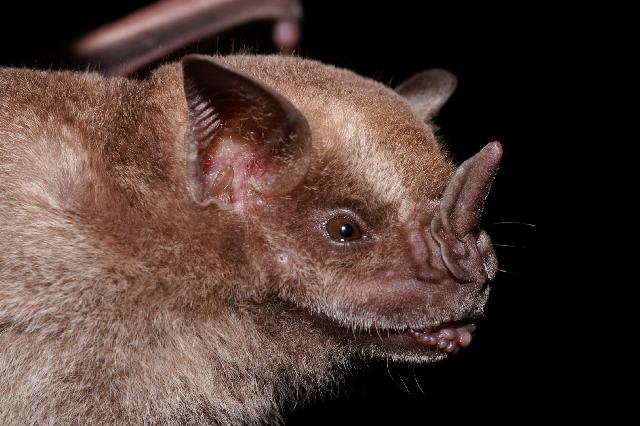
Closeup of head of Jamaican fruit bat

The Jamaican fruit bat is a medium-sized bat, having a total length of 78–89 mm (3.1–3.5 in) with a 96–150 mm (3.8–5.9 in) wingspan and weighing 40 to 60 g (1.4 to 2.1 oz). It has broad but pointed and ridged ears with a serrated tragus. Its prominent noseleaf has an array of sebaceous glands. The lower lip is littered with warts with a relatively large one in the center. Sebaceous holocrine glands can be found in both lips. On the back the fur is an ashy-shade of gray or brown with visible white hair bases and variable fur patterning on the face. The wings of the fruit bat are broad and dark gray in color. The underfur is paler in color. The fruit bat has no external tail. It has broad dark grey wings and a narrow hairless interfemoral membrane with a short calcar. The distinctive features of the Jamaican fruit bat (which however are shared by some of its relatives) include the absence of an external tail and a minimal, U-shaped interfemoral membrane.

A transcriptome dataset is available with more than 25,000 annotated transcripts that are directly searchable by BLAST. A genome assembly has also been generated.

== Distribution and habitat ==
The Jamaican fruit bat ranges from southern Mexico through Central America southward to northwestern South America (in Colombia). It also lives throughout the Caribbean islands of the Greater and Lesser Antilles, as well as the southern Bahamas.

The Jamaican fruit bat can be found in elevations from sea level to 2,135 m (7,005 ft). This species is found in a variety of habitats. It prefers habitats that are humid and tropical but has also adapted to cloud forests and drier tropical habitats. Fruit bats roost in caves, hollow trees, dense foliage, buildings and leaf tents. The fruit bat may create its own "tent" to roost in by altering broad leaves. These "tents" are only temporarily used.

== Taxonomy ==
Populations east of the Andes in South America (south to Argentina) have traditionally been included in the Jamaican fruit bat, but are now often regarded as a separate species, the flat-faced fruit-eating bat (A. planirostris). Further research is necessary to establish its exact taxonomic status. Further populations in Ecuador, Peru and southwestern Colombia west of the Andes were attributed to a new species, Artibeus aequatorialis. The Lesser Antilles populations have since been described to be Artibeus schwartzi.

== Diet ==
The Jamaican fruit bat is a frugivore. They eat a number of kinds of fruit but focus mostly on figs; at Barro Colorado Island, Panama, figs make up more than 78% of the fruits eaten. Bats will also supplement leaves of plants with high amounts of protein. Overall, the fruit bat consumes a diverse amount of plants but locally only eats certain types. A Jamaican fruit-eating bat plucks its food and carries it away with its mouth before eating it in its roosts. As such it can disperse seeds fairly far. Fruit bats have been recorded carrying fruits weighing 3–14 g (0.11–0.49 oz) or even as much as 50 g (1.8 oz). Jamaican fruit bats rely on sight and smell to find fruit of certain colors and odors. They mainly feed on Ficus figs and also on other fruits like avocados, mangoes, guava, papaya and bananas. In the dry season, their diet can consist of leaves of plants whose foliage has large amounts of protein, nectar, pollen, flower pieces and a few insects.

== Mortality ==
The maximum longevity for the Jamaican fruit bat is nine years in the wild. Predators of Jamaican fruit bats include American barn owls, boa constrictors and possibly other arboreal snakes, common opossums, gray four-eyed opossums, white-nosed coatis, false vampire bats, spectacled owls, mottled owls, Middle American screech owls, and bat falcons. Bats from various sites have been found with Histoplasma capsulatum. Some individual bats may have rabies. Fruit bats also are susceptible to various internal parasites: nematodes and ringworms, and external parasites: mites, ticks and chiggers.

== Behavior ==
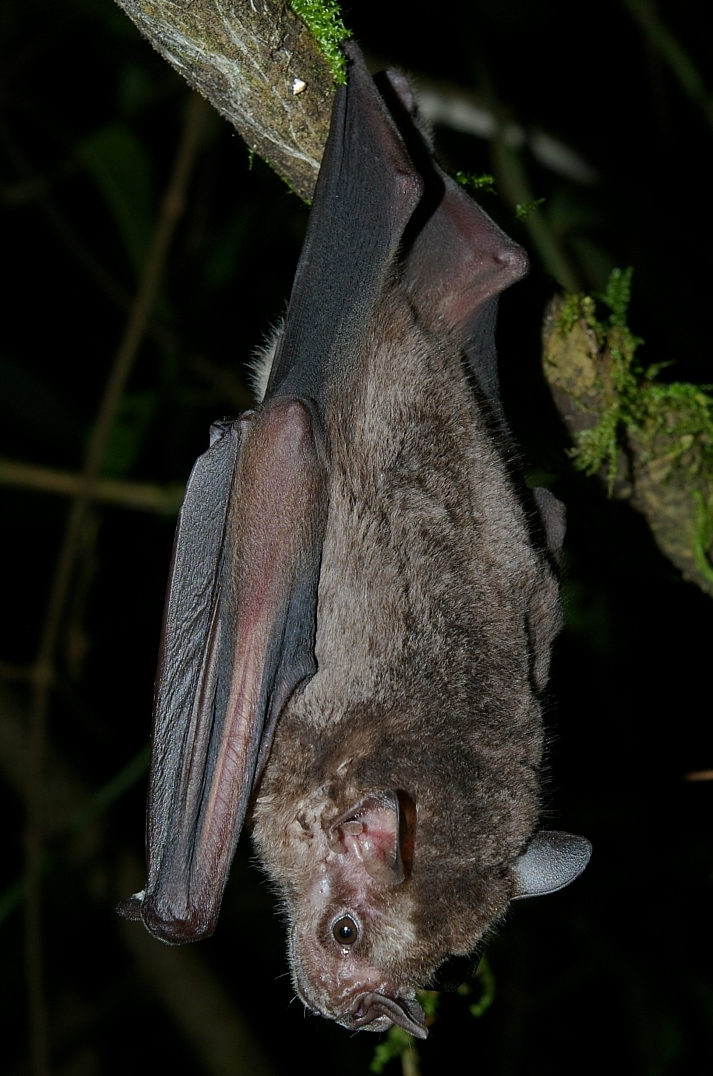
A Jamaican fruit bat hanging from a tree

When in their roosts, the Jamaican fruit bat has a reproductive system known as "resource defensive polygyny". That is, males will claim an area as a territory and females select the best territories to roost and mate in. Subadult males may remain in their natal roosts while females may leave to gather with other females elsewhere. In caves where there are enough roosting sites, there is some "female defensive polygyny". Here, harem males actively defend females during the breeding seasons and will attack satellite males that roost in the walls and ceilings of caves. However, they tolerate males who are subordinate to them in their harems. Satellite males are more common in large groups than smaller groups and dominant and subordinate males will cooperate to defend harem females. In large groups, dominant males may be the fathers of the subordinates.

When bats going on foraging trips, it is the dominant males that are the first to leave to the roosting sites and the last to return. At dusk, males spend much time flying near the tree roosts displacing any intruders. Jamaican fruit bats are most active at midnight; following that, activity begins to die down.

When captured, a Jamaican fruit bat will warn conspecifics with a distress call made of a long series of pulses typically lasting 15 kHz. The Jamaican fruit bat will also react to the distress calls of other species and to their own recorded calls. The fruit bat is considered a whisper bat and makes three low-intensity FM pulses during flight and when resting.

== Breeding ==
Breeding in the Jamaican fruit bat is bimodal and polyestrous with births being dependent on fruit abundance. Females give birth twice a year with one young on average for each birth. Mating is highest at the end of the wet season and births take place in the dry months. Embryonic development may delay in the second breeding season but parturition will occur in the follow breeding period. The testes of the males enlarge when females enter estrous. The testes tend to be slightly larger in harem males than bachelors and the canine teeth tend to be more worn in the former. Copulation occurs until 2–25 days after the previous births. Pups born in a harem may sometimes be sired by satellite or subordinate males depending on the size of the group. Gestation is usually 3.5–4 months but can be as long as 7 months when there's delayed embryonic development. The female gives birth while perching and the newborn emerges unaided, head first. The mothers will eat the placenta. Mothers carry their pups when they are one day old but later leave them in the roosting area for the day. The female's nipples become enlarged during lactation. Young are weaned by 15 days. Young gain a full, permanent set of teeth at 40 days and can fly by 50 days when their forearms are fully developed. Females are sexually mature by eight months and males by 12 months.

== Status ==
Throughout most of its range, the Jamaican fruit bat is numerous. It was found to be the most influential of the frugivorous bat community. The fruit bat has greater ecological importance in wet habitats. The Jamaican fruit eating bat does not seem to be threatened from a conservation standpoint. It appears to be common regardless of any habitat disruption. However, it may damage fruit crops in certain areas.
