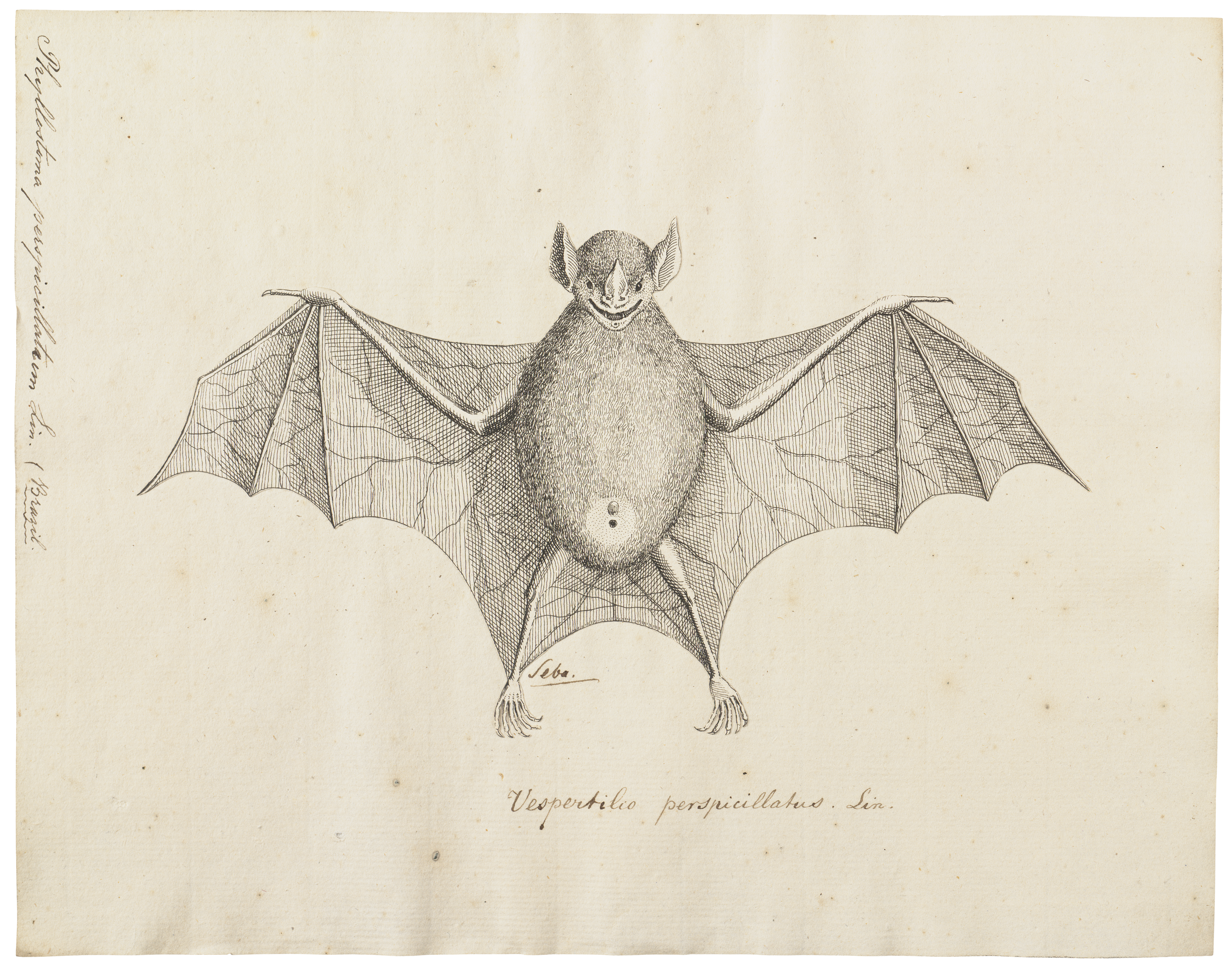

Conservation status
- Least Concern (IUCN 3.1)

Scientific classification
- Kingdom: Animalia
- Phylum: Chordata
- Class: Mammalia
- Order: Chiroptera
- Family: Phyllostomidae
- Genus: Artibeus
- Species: A. lituratus

Binomial name
- Artibeus lituratus Olfers, 1818

Synonyms
- Artibeus intermedius Allen, 1897

= Great fruit-eating bat =

Species of bat

The great fruit-eating bat (Artibeus lituratus) is a bat species found from Mexico to Brazil and Argentina, as well as in Antigua and Barbuda, Barbados, Grenada, Martinique, Saint Lucia, Saint Vincent and the Grenadines and Trinidad and Tobago.

== Description ==
They weigh 10.5 grams (0.37 oz) at birth and grow to 65 grams (2.3 oz) as adults. The heart of A. lituratus contains unique membranous structures not seen in any other mammal. The functions of these differences are still being studied, but may possibly aid in keeping the heart in the correct position while upside down, flight assistance, and energy reservation.

In Panama, it has been found that some Artibeus lituratus fly with 18-23g fruits of Dipteryx panamensis (Fabaceae), which is a third of the animal's body weight, up to hundreds of meters from the parent tree.

== Threats ==
Reproductive damage within A. lituratus has been linked with the insecticide deltamethrin.

Artibeus lituratus defence call when being held by a human
Recorded at the Tiputini Biodiversity Station

== Gallery ==
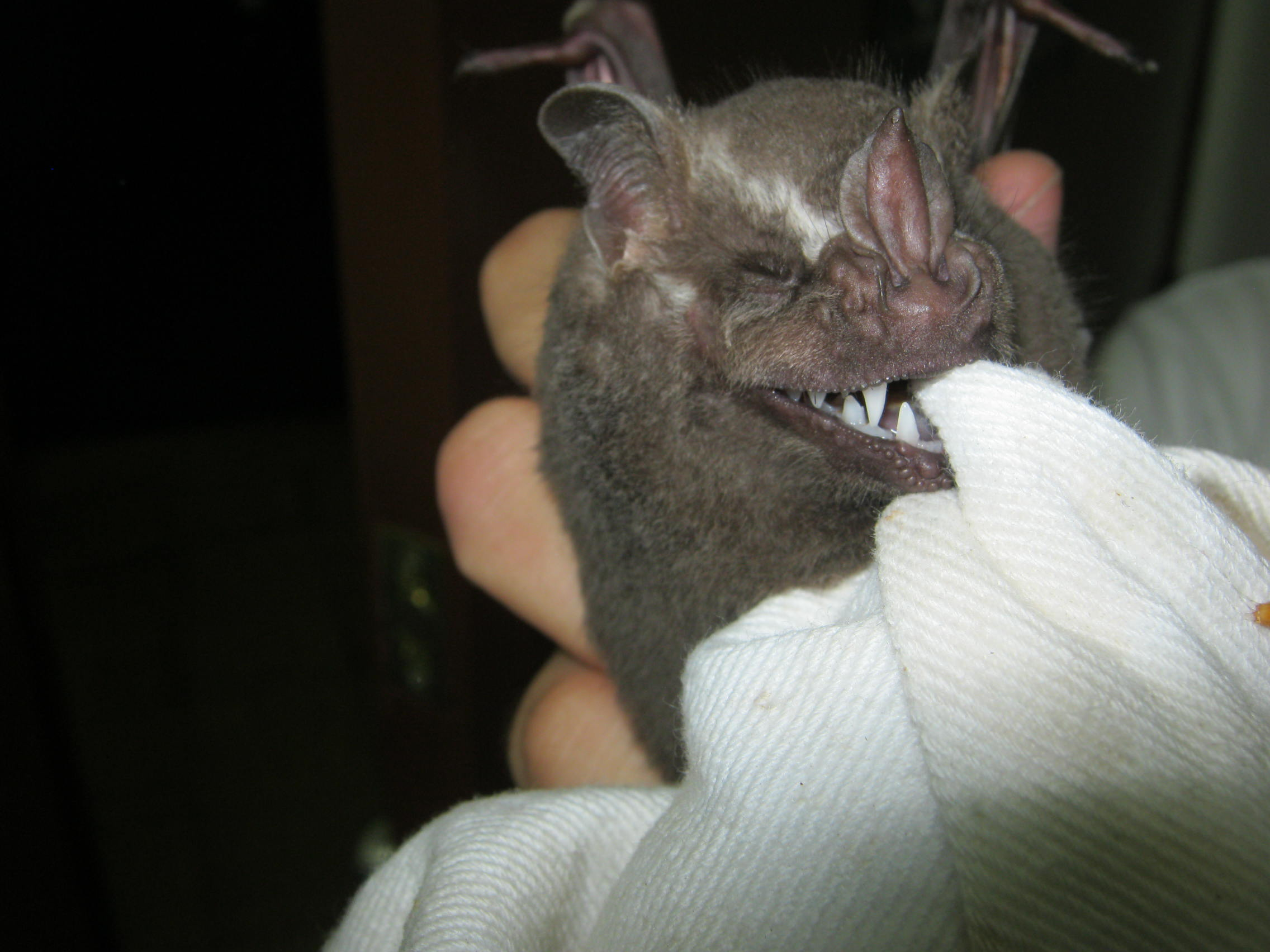

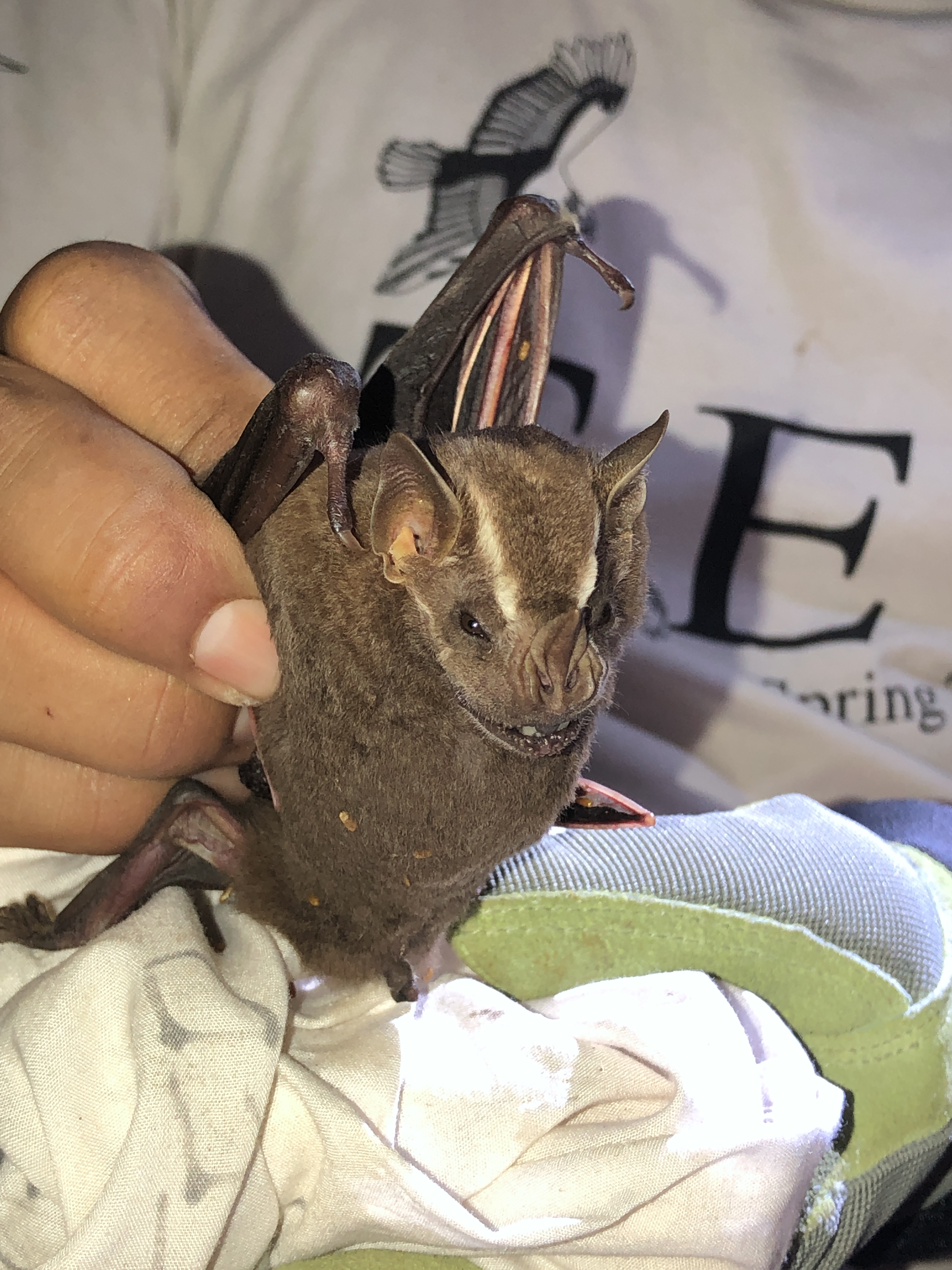

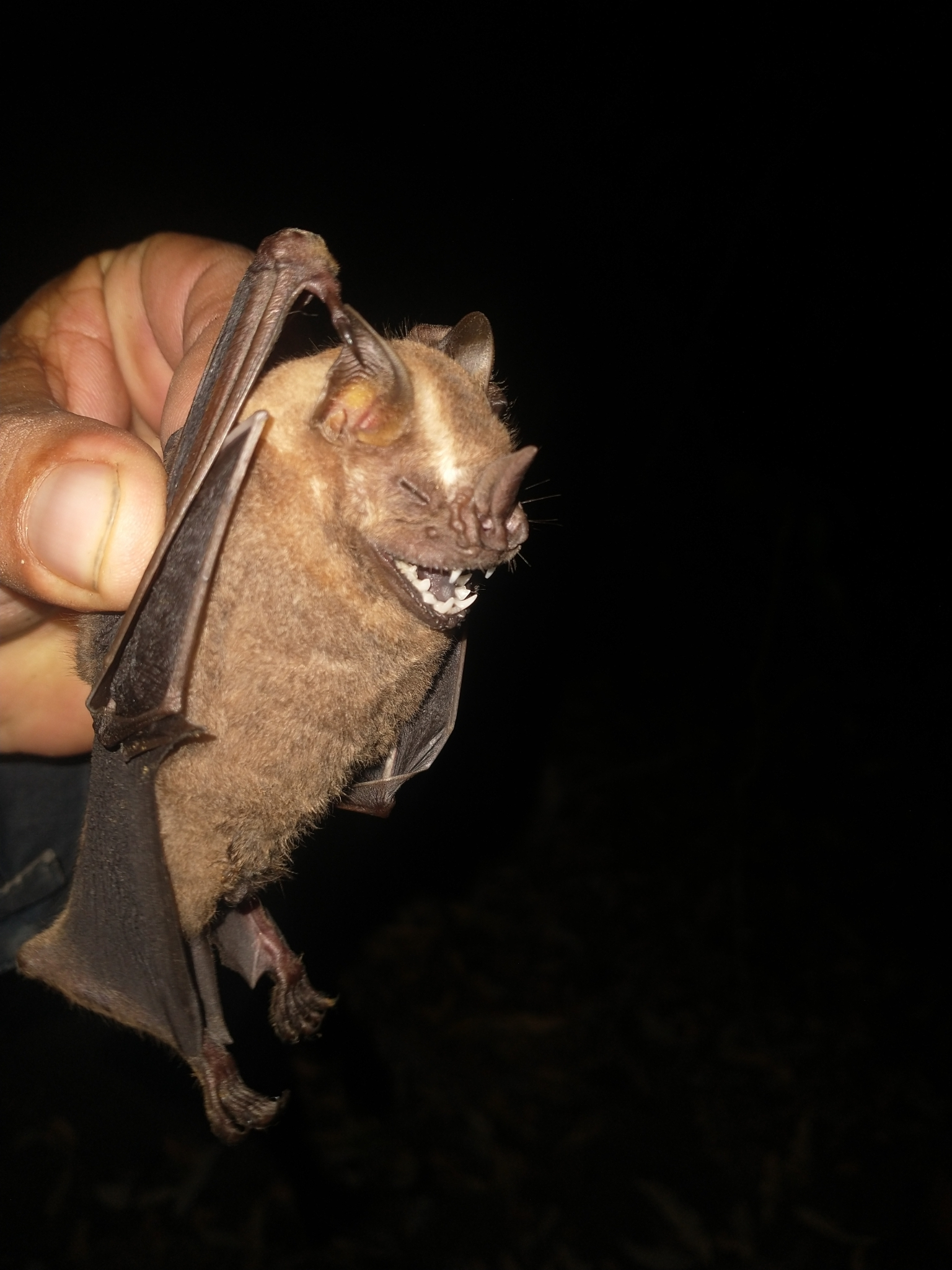
