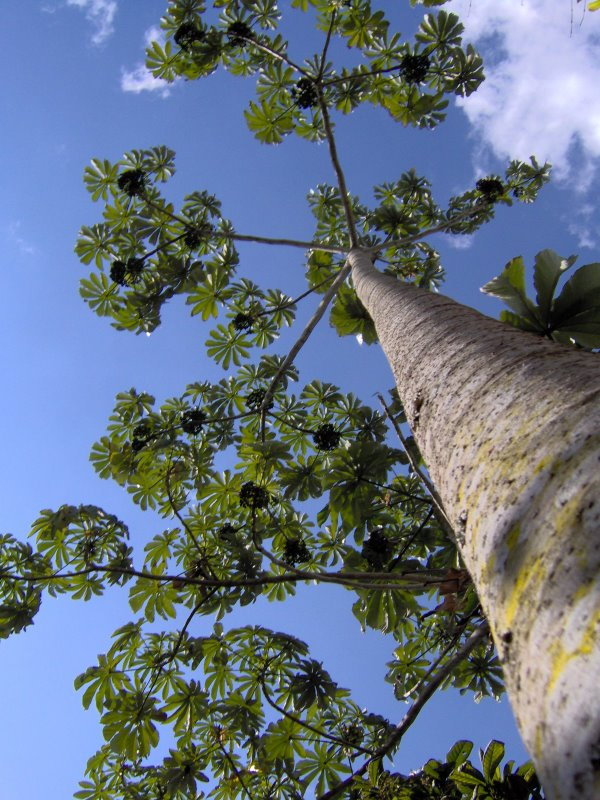

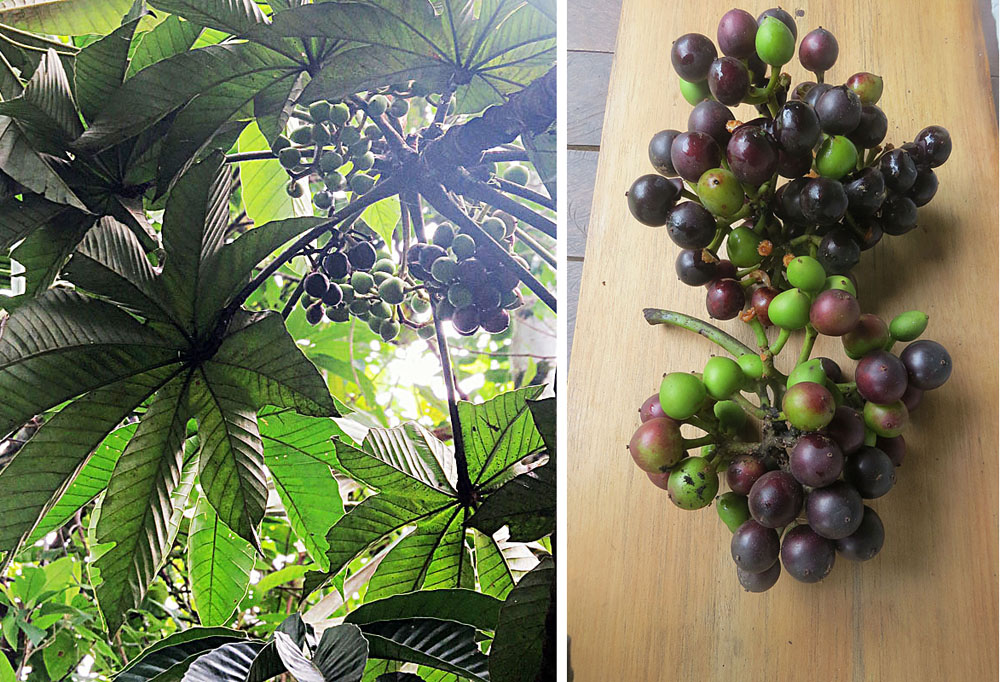

Conservation status
- Least Concern (IUCN 3.1)

Scientific classification
- Kingdom: Plantae
- Clade: Embryophytes
- Clade: Tracheophytes
- Clade: Spermatophytes
- Clade: Angiosperms
- Clade: Eudicots
- Clade: Rosids
- Order: Rosales
- Family: Urticaceae
- Genus: Pourouma
- Species: P. cecropiifolia

Binomial name
- Pourouma cecropiifolia Mart.

= Pourouma cecropiifolia =

Species of tree

Pourouma cecropiifolia (Amazon grape, Amazon tree-grape or uvilla; syn. P. multifida) is a species of Pourouma, native to tropical South America, in the western Amazon Basin in northern Bolivia, western Brazil, southeastern Colombia, eastern Ecuador, eastern Peru, and southern Venezuela. It is a medium-sized evergreen tree growing to 20 m tall. The leaves are palmately compound, with 9–11 leaflets 10–20 cm long and 2.5–4 cm broad, on a 20 cm petiole. The flowers are white, produced 20 or more together in a 10 cm long inflorescence; it is dioecious, with male and female flowers on separate trees. The fruit is ovoid, 1–2 cm long, purple when ripe, grape-like in appearance but with a wintergreen smell and a root beer flavour; the skin is rough, inedible but easily peeled.

== Agriculture ==
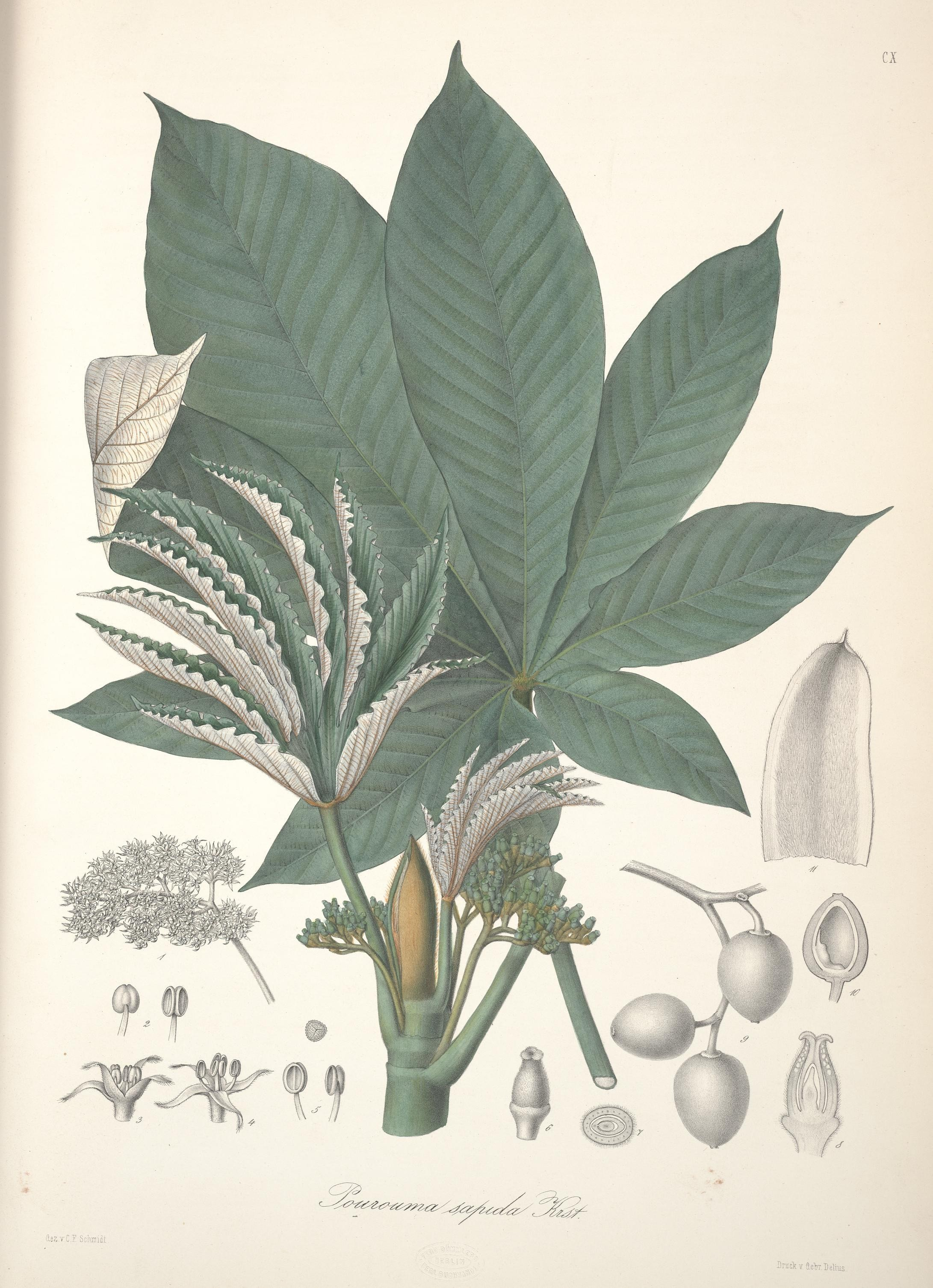
P. cecropiifolia (named as P. sapida) Pl. CX of Florae Columbiae.

The fruit is sweet and juicy, eaten fresh and made into jams. The skin is abrasive, and can cause injuries to the sensitive skin around the mouth. It should be peeled before being eaten. The tree grows quickly, and grows well in poor upland soils. It is vulnerable to floods. The fruit is susceptible to fungal attacks and does not keep well, which limits its commercial viability.

It is considered a wild edible plant, as most of the little cultivation is for domestic consumption.
