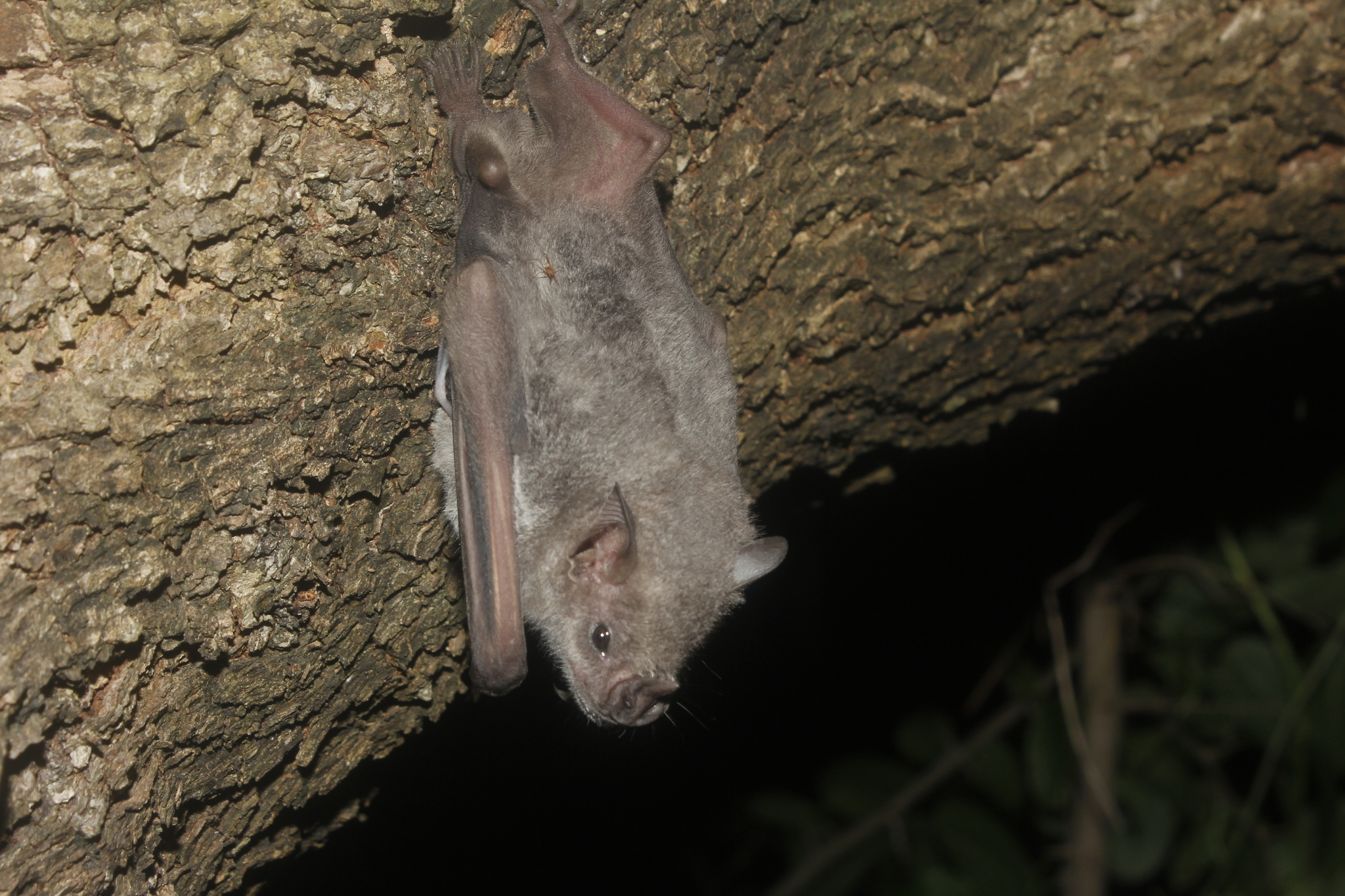

Conservation status
- Least Concern (IUCN 3.1)

Scientific classification
- Kingdom: Animalia
- Phylum: Chordata
- Class: Mammalia
- Order: Chiroptera
- Family: Phyllostomidae
- Genus: Artibeus
- Species: A. hirsutus

Binomial name
- Artibeus hirsutus K. Andersen, 1906

= Hairy fruit-eating bat =

Species of bat

The hairy fruit-eating bat (Artibeus hirsutus) is a species of bat in the family Phyllostomidae. It is endemic to Mexico.
