= Outline of Dominica =

Country in the Caribbean

The Flag of Dominica

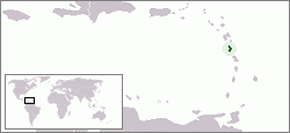
The location of Dominica

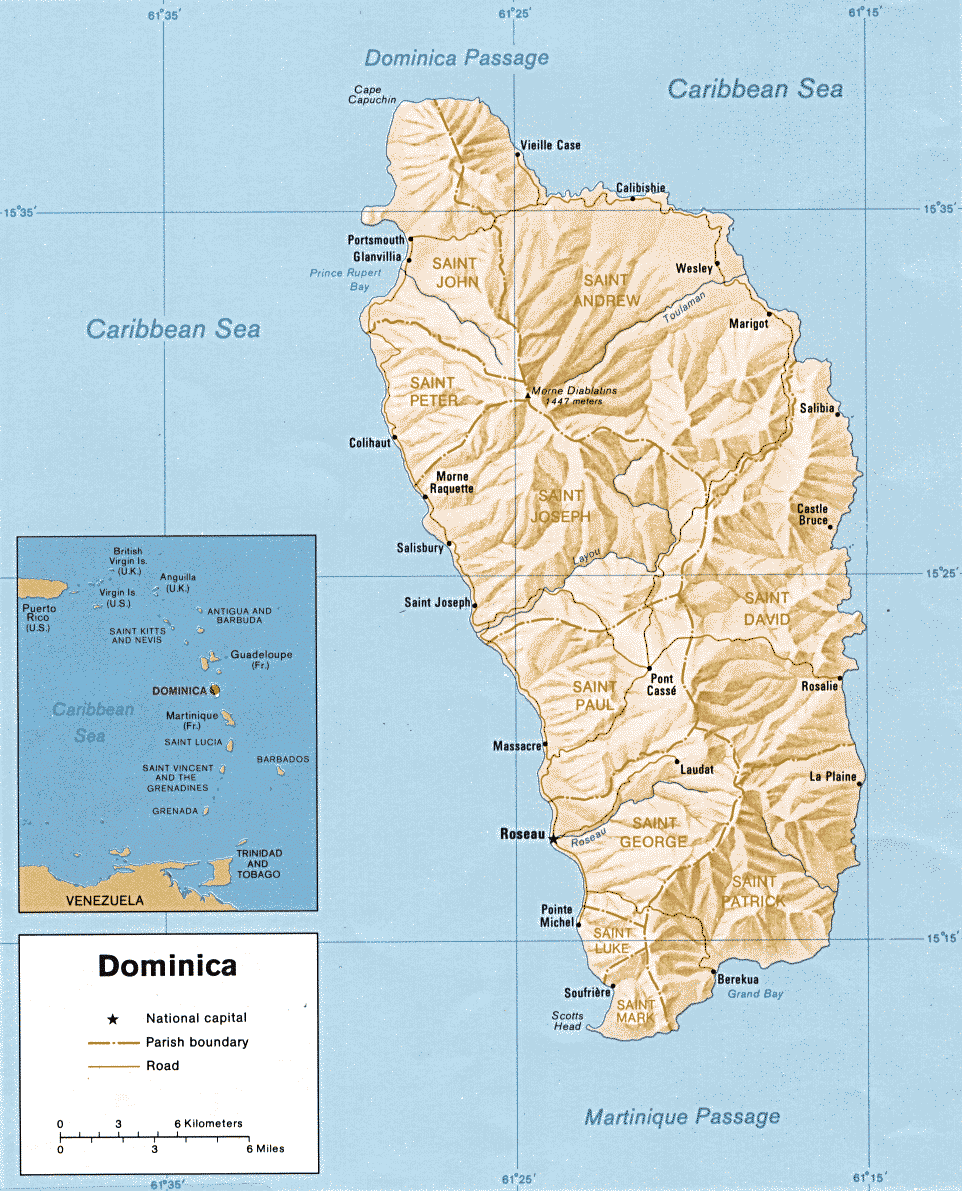
An enlargeable relief map of the Commonwealth of Dominica

The following outline is provided as an overview of and topical guide to Dominica:

Dominica – sovereign island nation located in the Caribbean Sea. In Latin, its name means "Sunday", which was the day on which it was discovered by Christopher Columbus. Dominica's pre-Columbian name was Wai'tu kubuli, which means "Tall is her body". The Carib Territory was established for the indigenous people of the island. Because the island lies between two French overseas departments, Guadeloupe to the north and Martinique to the south, and because it was colonized by France for a time, it is sometimes called "French Dominica". However, its official language is English, though a French creole is commonly spoken. Dominica has been nicknamed the "Nature Isle of the Caribbean" for its largely unspoiled natural environment. It is one of the youngest islands in the Lesser Antilles, still being formed by geothermal-volcanic activity, as evidenced by the world's second-largest boiling lake. The island features lush mountainous rainforests, home of many very rare plant, animal, and bird species. There are xeric areas in some of the western coastal regions, but heavy rainfall can be expected inland. The sisserou parrot, the island's national bird, is featured on the national flag. Dominica's economy is heavily dependent on both tourism and agriculture.

== General Reference ==
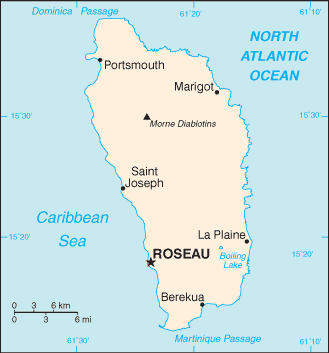
An enlargeable basic map of Dominica

- Pronunciation: /ˌdɒmɪˈniːkə/ dom-i-NEE-kə
- Common English country name: Dominica
- Official English country name: The Commonwealth of Dominica
- Common endonym(s):
- Official endonym(s):
- Adjectival(s): Dominican
- Demonym(s):
- Etymology: Name of Dominica
- ISO country codes: DM, DMA, 212
- ISO region codes: See ISO 3166-2:DM
- Internet country code top-level domain: .dm

== Geography of Dominica ==
Geography of Dominica

- Dominica is: a country
- Location:
  - Northern Hemisphere and Western Hemisphere
    - North America (though not on the mainland)
  - Atlantic Ocean
    - North Atlantic
      - Caribbean
        - Antilles
          - Lesser Antilles
            - Windward Islands
  - Time zone: Eastern Caribbean Time (UTC-04)
  - Extreme points of Dominica
    - High: Morne Diablotins 1,447 m (4,747 ft)
    - Low: Caribbean Sea 0 m
  - Land boundaries: none
  - Coastline: 148 km
- Population of Dominica: 67,000 - 195th most populous country
- Area of Dominica: 754 km^{2}
- Atlas of Dominica

=== Environment of Dominica ===
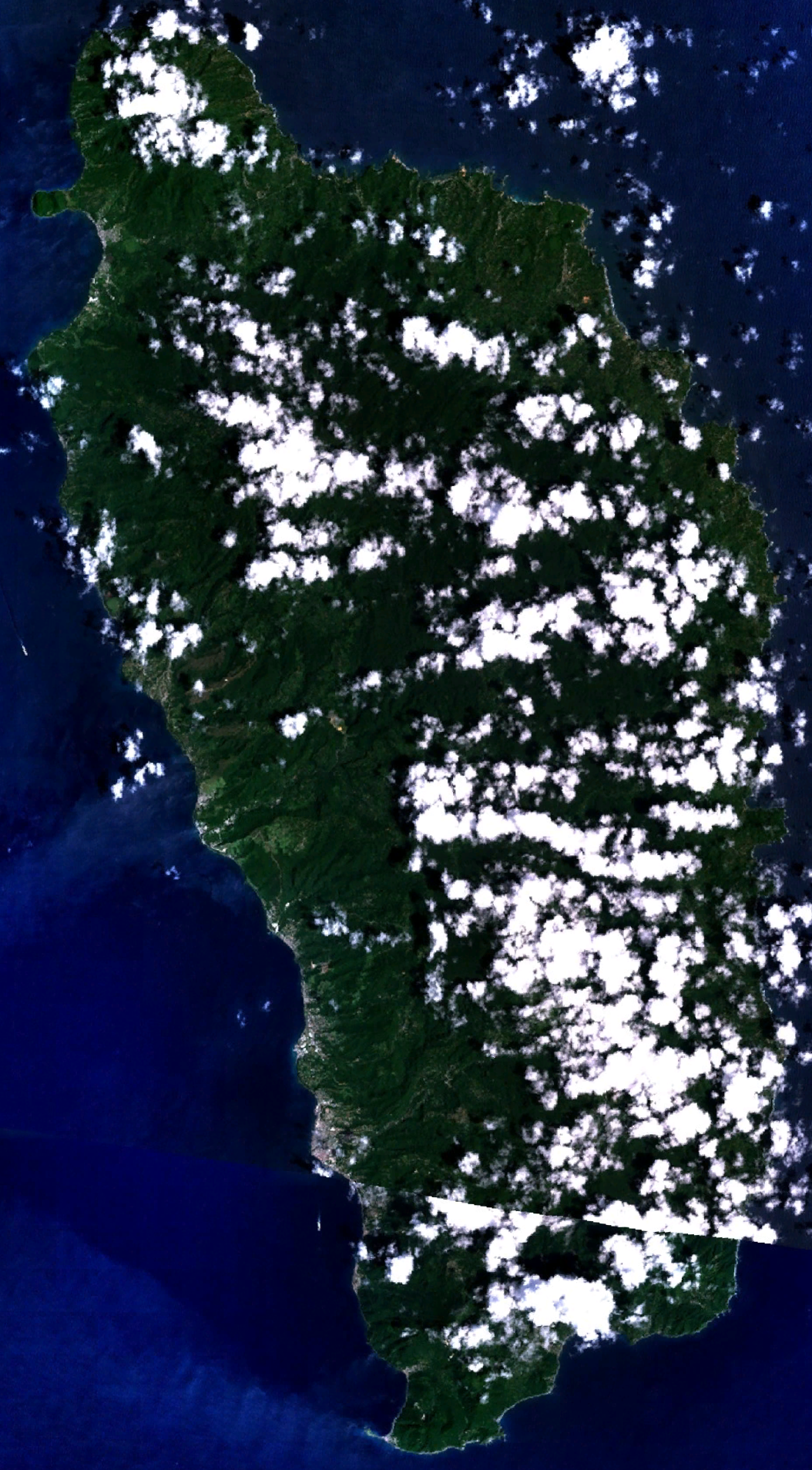
An enlargeable satellite image of Dominica

- Climate of Dominica
- Renewable energy in Dominica
- Geology of Dominica
- Protected areas of Dominica
  - Biosphere reserves in Dominica
  - National parks of Dominica
- Wildlife of Dominica
  - Fauna of Dominica
    - Amphibians and reptiles of Dominica
    - Birds of Dominica
    - Butterflies of Dominica
    - Decapod crustaceans of Dominica
    - Mammals of Dominica
    - Non-marine molluscs of Dominica

==== Natural geographic features of Dominica ====
- Bodies of water
  - Bays of Dominica
  - Islands of Dominica
  - Lakes of Dominica
  - Rivers of Dominica
    - Waterfalls of Dominica
- Landforms
  - Mountains of Dominica
    - Volcanoes in Dominica
  - Valleys of Dominica
- World Heritage Sites in Dominica

=== Regions of Dominica ===
Regions of Dominica

==== Ecoregions of Dominica ====
List of ecoregions in Dominica

==== Administrative divisions of Dominica ====
Parishes of Dominica

===== Municipalities of Dominica =====
- Capital of Dominica: Roseau
- Cities of Dominica

=== Demography of Dominica ===
Demographics of Dominica

== Government and politics of Dominica ==
Politics of Dominica

- Form of government: parliamentary representative democratic republic
- Capital of Dominica: Roseau
- Elections in Dominica
- Political parties in Dominica

=== Branches of the government of Dominica ===
Government of Dominica

==== Executive branch of the government of Dominica ====
- Head of state: President of Dominica, Nicholas Liverpool
- Head of government: Prime Minister of Dominica, Roosevelt Skerritt
- Cabinet of Dominica

==== Legislative branch of the government of Dominica ====
- House of Assembly of Dominica (unicameral)

==== Judicial branch of the government of Dominica ====
Court system of Dominica

=== Foreign relations of Dominica ===
Foreign relations of Dominica

- Diplomatic missions in Dominica
- Diplomatic missions of Dominica

==== International organization membership ====
The Commonwealth of Dominica is a member of:

- African, Caribbean, and Pacific Group of States (ACP)
- Agency for the Prohibition of Nuclear Weapons in Latin America and the Caribbean (OPANAL)
- Caribbean Community and Common Market (Caricom)
- Caribbean Development Bank (CDB)
- Commonwealth of Nations
- Food and Agriculture Organization (FAO)
- Group of 77 (G77)
- International Bank for Reconstruction and Development (IBRD)
- International Criminal Court (ICCt)
- International Criminal Police Organization (Interpol)
- International Development Association (IDA)
- International Federation of Red Cross and Red Crescent Societies (IFRCS)
- International Finance Corporation (IFC)
- International Fund for Agricultural Development (IFAD)
- International Labour Organization (ILO)
- International Maritime Organization (IMO)
- International Monetary Fund (IMF)
- International Olympic Committee (IOC)
- International Organization for Standardization (ISO) (subscriber)
- International Red Cross and Red Crescent Movement (ICRM)
- International Telecommunication Union (ITU)
- International Trade Union Confederation (ITUC)
- Multilateral Investment Guarantee Agency (MIGA)
- Nonaligned Movement (NAM)
- Organisation internationale de la Francophonie (OIF)
- Organisation for the Prohibition of Chemical Weapons (OPCW)
- Organization of American States (OAS)
- Organization of Eastern Caribbean States (OECS)
- United Nations (UN)
- United Nations Conference on Trade and Development (UNCTAD)
- United Nations Educational, Scientific, and Cultural Organization (UNESCO)
- United Nations Industrial Development Organization (UNIDO)
- Universal Postal Union (UPU)
- World Confederation of Labour (WCL)
- World Federation of Trade Unions (WFTU)
- World Health Organization (WHO)
- World Intellectual Property Organization (WIPO)
- World Meteorological Organization (WMO)
- World Trade Organization (WTO)

=== Law and order in Dominica ===
Law of Dominica

- Constitution of Dominica
- Crime in Dominica
- Human rights in Dominica
  - LGBT rights in Dominica
  - Freedom of religion in Dominica
- Dominica Police Force

=== Military of Dominica ===
Military of Dominica

- Command
  - Commander-in-chief:
    - Ministry of Defence of Dominica
- Forces
  - Army of Dominica
  - Navy of Dominica
  - Air Force of Dominica
  - Special forces of Dominica
- Military history of Dominica
- Military ranks of Dominica

=== Local government in Dominica ===
Local government in Dominica

- Carib Territory

== History of Dominica ==
History of Dominica

- Timeline of the history of Dominica
- Current events of Dominica
- Military history of Dominica

== Culture of Dominica ==
Culture of Dominica

- Architecture of Dominica
- Cuisine of Dominica
- Festivals in Dominica
- Languages of Dominica
- Media in Dominica
- National symbols of Dominica
  - Coat of arms of Dominica
  - Flag of Dominica
  - National anthem of Dominica
- People of Dominica
- Public holidays in Dominica
- Records of Dominica
- Religion in Dominica
  - Christianity in Dominica
    - Roman Catholicism in Dominica
  - Hinduism in Dominica
  - Islam in Dominica
  - Judaism in Dominica
  - Sikhism in Dominica
- World Heritage Sites in Dominica

=== Art in Dominica ===
- Art in Dominica
- Cinema of Dominica
- Literature of Dominica
- Music of Dominica
- Television in Dominica
- Theatre in Dominica

=== Sports in Dominica ===
Sports in Dominica

- Football in Dominica
- Dominica at the Olympics

== Economy and infrastructure of Dominica ==
Economy of Dominica

- Economic rank, by nominal GDP (2007): 183rd (one hundred and eighty third)
- Agriculture in Dominica
- Banking in Dominica
  - National Bank of Dominica
- Communications in Dominica
  - Internet in Dominica
- Companies of Dominica
- Currency of Dominica: Dollar
  - ISO 4217: XCD
- Energy in Dominica
  - Energy policy of Dominica
  - Oil industry in Dominica
- Mining in Dominica
- Tourism in Dominica
- Transportation in Dominica
  - Airports in Dominica
  - Rail transport in Dominica
  - Roads in Dominica
- Dominica Stock Exchange

== Education in Dominica ==
Education in Dominica

- Universities in Dominica

== Health in Dominica ==
- Health care in Dominica

== See also ==
Dominica

- List of Dominica-related topics
- List of international rankings
- Member state of the Commonwealth of Nations
- Member state of the United Nations
- Outline of geography
- Outline of North America
- Outline of the Caribbean
