= List of Dominican newspapers =

List of Dominican newspapers may refer to:

- List of newspapers in Dominica
- List of newspapers in the Dominican Republic
