= Dominican =

Dominican may refer to:

== Religious communities ==
- Dominican Order, a Catholic order, formally the Order of Preachers
- Anglican Order of Preachers, loosely referred to as Dominicans

== Nations ==
- Dominican Republic, on the island of Hispaniola in the Greater Antilles, in the Caribbean
  - People of the Dominican Republic
  - Demographics of the Dominican Republic
  - Culture of the Dominican Republic
- Dominica, an island nation in the Lesser Antilles, in the Caribbean
  - Demographics of Dominica
  - Culture of Dominica

== See also ==
- Dominican College (disambiguation), the name of several colleges
- Dominican School of Philosophy and Theology, Berkeley, California, United States
- Dominican University (disambiguation)
