= List of bays of Dominica =

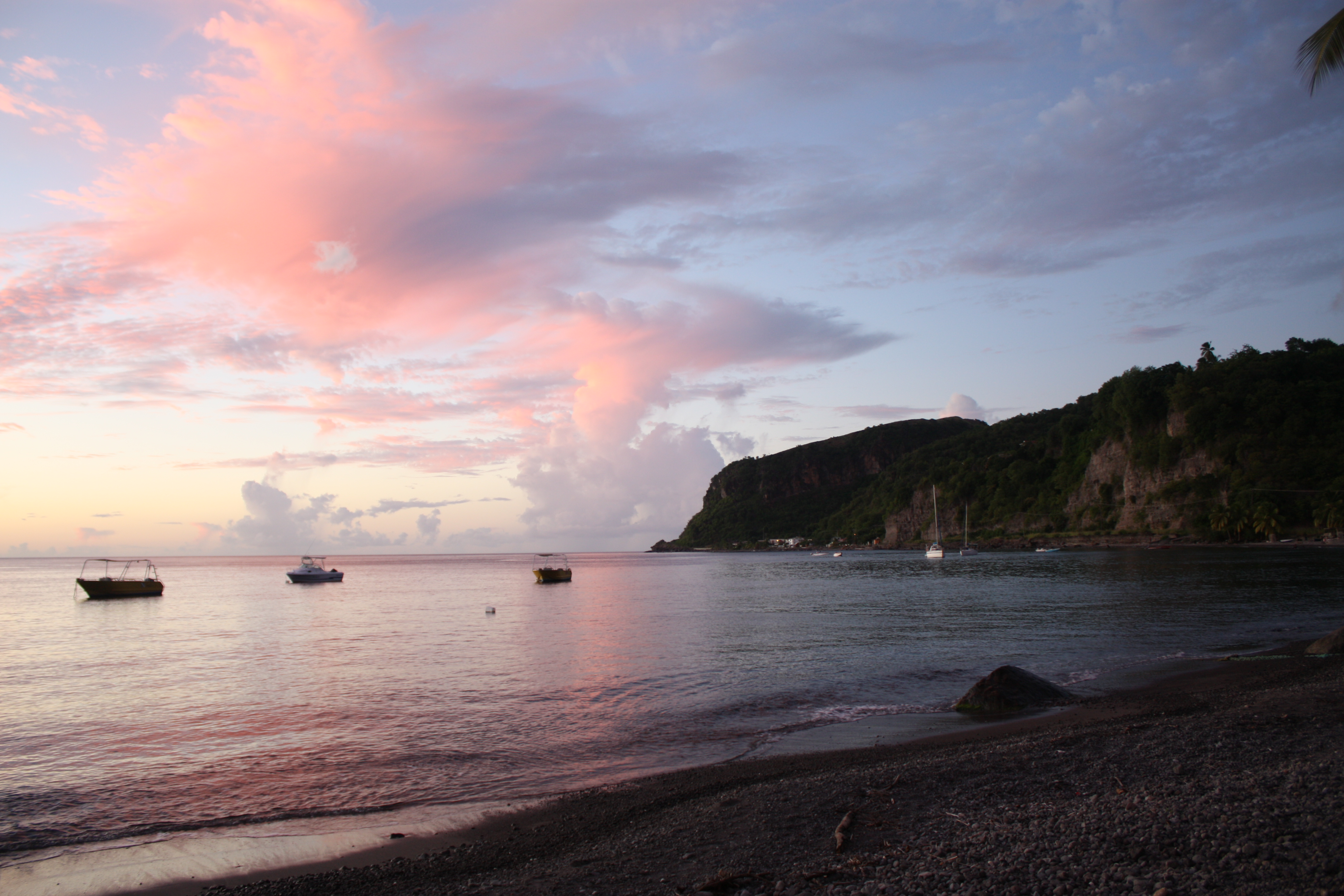
Batalie Bay on Dominica's west coast, looking north to Coulibistrie.

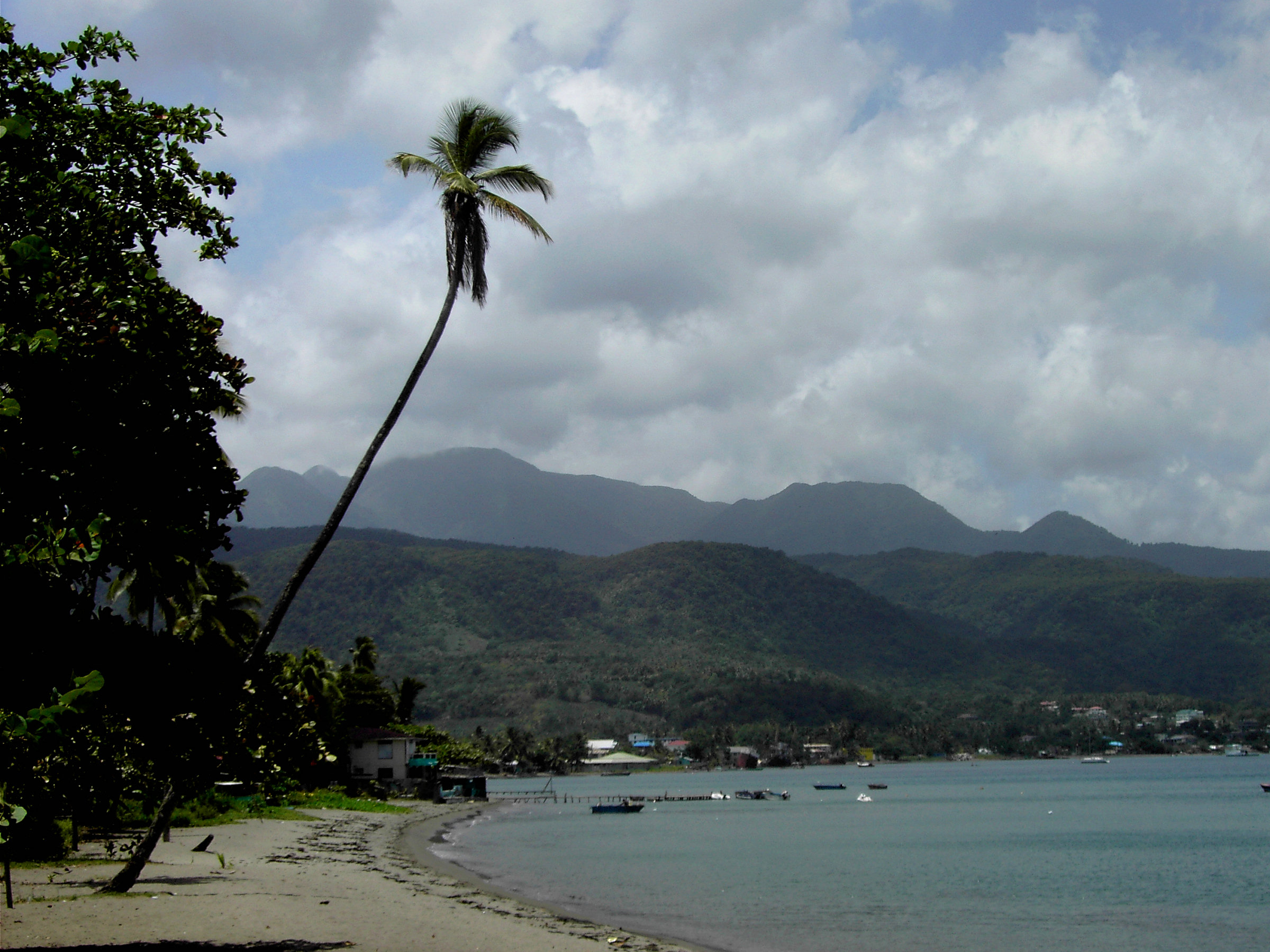
Prince Rupert Bay on Dominica's northwest coast, looking south to Portsmouth.

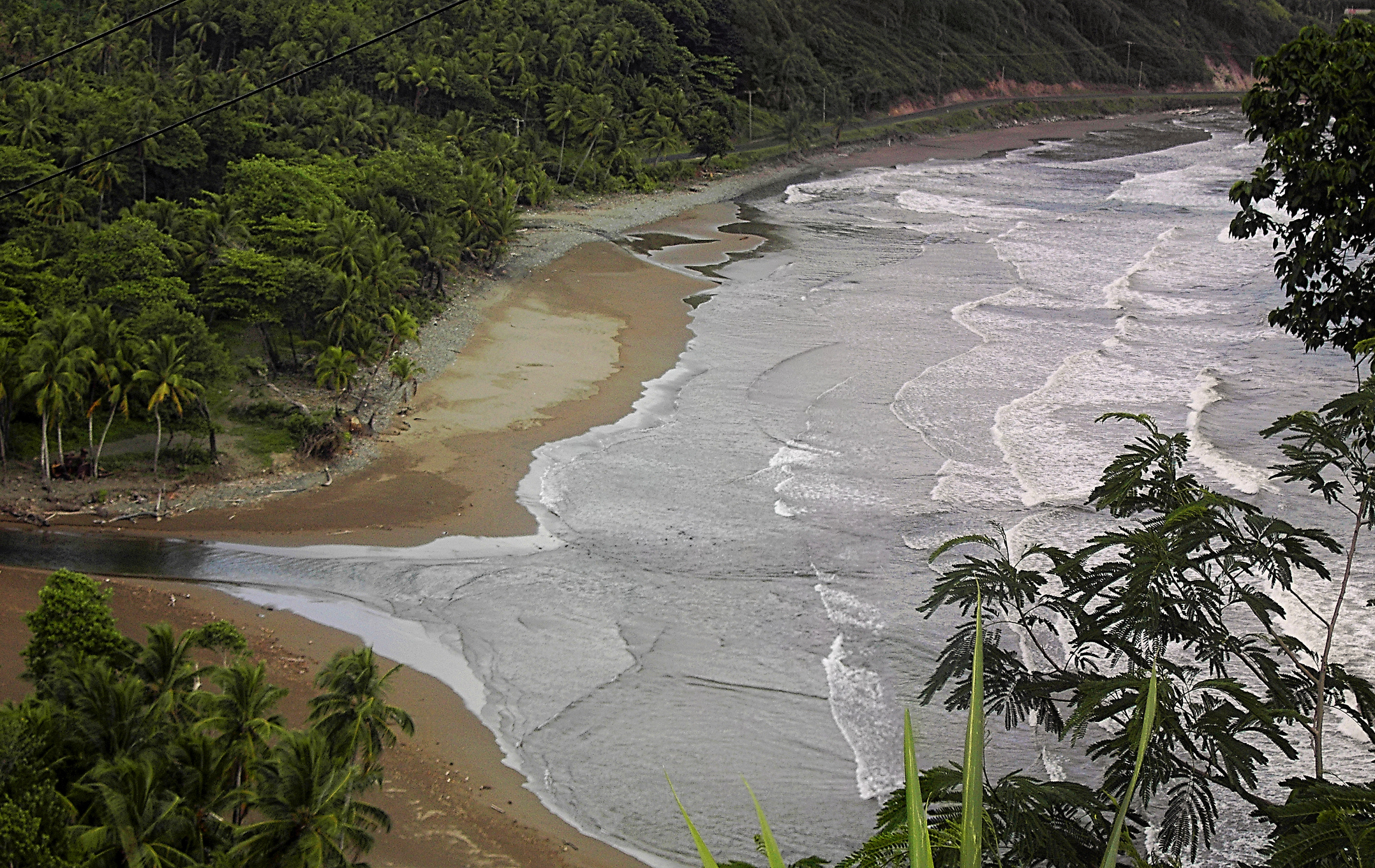
Pagua Bay on the northeast coast, the outlet of the Pagua River.

Dominica is an island-nation in the Caribbean that is part of the Lesser Antilles chain of islands.

- Anse Du Mai
- Anse Soldat

Anse Maho

- Batalie Bay
- Batibou Bay
- Bout Sable Bay
- Douglas Bay
- Grand Bay
- Grand Marigot Bay
- Hampstead Bay
- Hodges Bay
- Londonderry Bay
- Pagua Bay
- Petite Soufrière Bay
- Prince Rupert Bay
- Pringles Bay
- Rosalie Bay
- Soufrière Bay
- St. David's Bay
- Toucari Bay
- Woodbridge Bay
- Woodford Hill Bay
