= Telecommunications in Dominica =

Telecommunications in Dominica comprises telephone, radio, television and internet services. The primary regulatory authority is the National Telecommunication Regulatory Commission which regulates all related industries to comply with The Telecommunications Act 8 of 2000.

== Telephony ==
Calls from Dominica to the US, Canada, and other NANP Caribbean nations, are dialed as 1 + NANP area code + 7-digit number. Calls from Dominica to non-NANP countries are dialed as 011 + country code + phone number with local area code.

Telephone system

- Domestic: fully automatic network
- International: microwave radio relay and SHF radiotelephone links to Martinique and Guadeloupe; VHF and UHF radiotelephone links to Saint Lucia

Number formatting

- Telephone code: 767
- Number Format: nxx-xxxx
- Country Code: +1767
- International Call Prefix: 011 (outside NANP)

Mobile cellular service providers

- Digicel
- FLOW

== Internet ==
Internet service providers (ISPs)

- Cable & Wireless Dominica Ltd (DSL)
- Digicel Play (Cable & FTTP)
- Marpin Telecoms (Cable)

Internet code
.dm

== Radio ==
Dominica's radio stations include the government-owned DBS Radio, as well as privately owned competitors Kairi FM and Q95; a religious service called Voice of Life also operates there. DBS was founded in 1971 as Radio Dominica (supplanting material provided by Grenada's Windward Islands Broadcasting Service, WIBS), while Voice of Life was established in 1974 by two North American missionaries and began transmissions in 1976. In 1997, the island had 46,000 radio receivers.

== Television ==
During the 1970s, relay services from Barbados' Caribbean Broadcasting Corporation (CBC) represented the earliest attempts to bring television to Dominica; these were also provided to Saint Lucia and Saint Vincent and the Grenadines. The experiment ceased after Hurricane David devastated the country in 1979; at the time, transmission was served from the Morne Bruce locality.

In lieu of a national television broadcast service, Dominica received cable service through the Marpin company in 1983. By 2017, it was acquired by the local division of Flow, whose name it was rebranded under. As of the early 2020s, Flow mainly carried North American and British programming, and broadcast a weekday-morning programme entitled Good Morning Dominica. The country's other cable system, the later SAT Telecommunications, was similarly renamed Digicel Play in October 2014.

Dominica had 11,000 television sets in 2007.

== See also ==
- List of newspapers in Dominica
