= Dominican University =

Dominican University may refer to:

- Dominican University (Illinois) a private, Catholic university in River Forest, Illinois, United States
- Dominican University of California, an independent university of Catholic heritage in Marin County, California, United States
- Dominican University College a bilingual Roman Catholic university in Ottawa, Ontario, Canada
- Dominican University New York, an independent university of Catholic heritage in Orangeburg, New York, United States

== See also ==
- Dominican College (disambiguation)
