= Religion in Dominica =

Religion in Dominica (2020)
1. Catholic (61.4%)
2. Protestant (28.6%)
3. Unspecified beliefs or none (7.20%)
4. Rastafarian (1.30%)
5. Jehovah's Witness (1.20%)
6. Other Religions (0.30%)

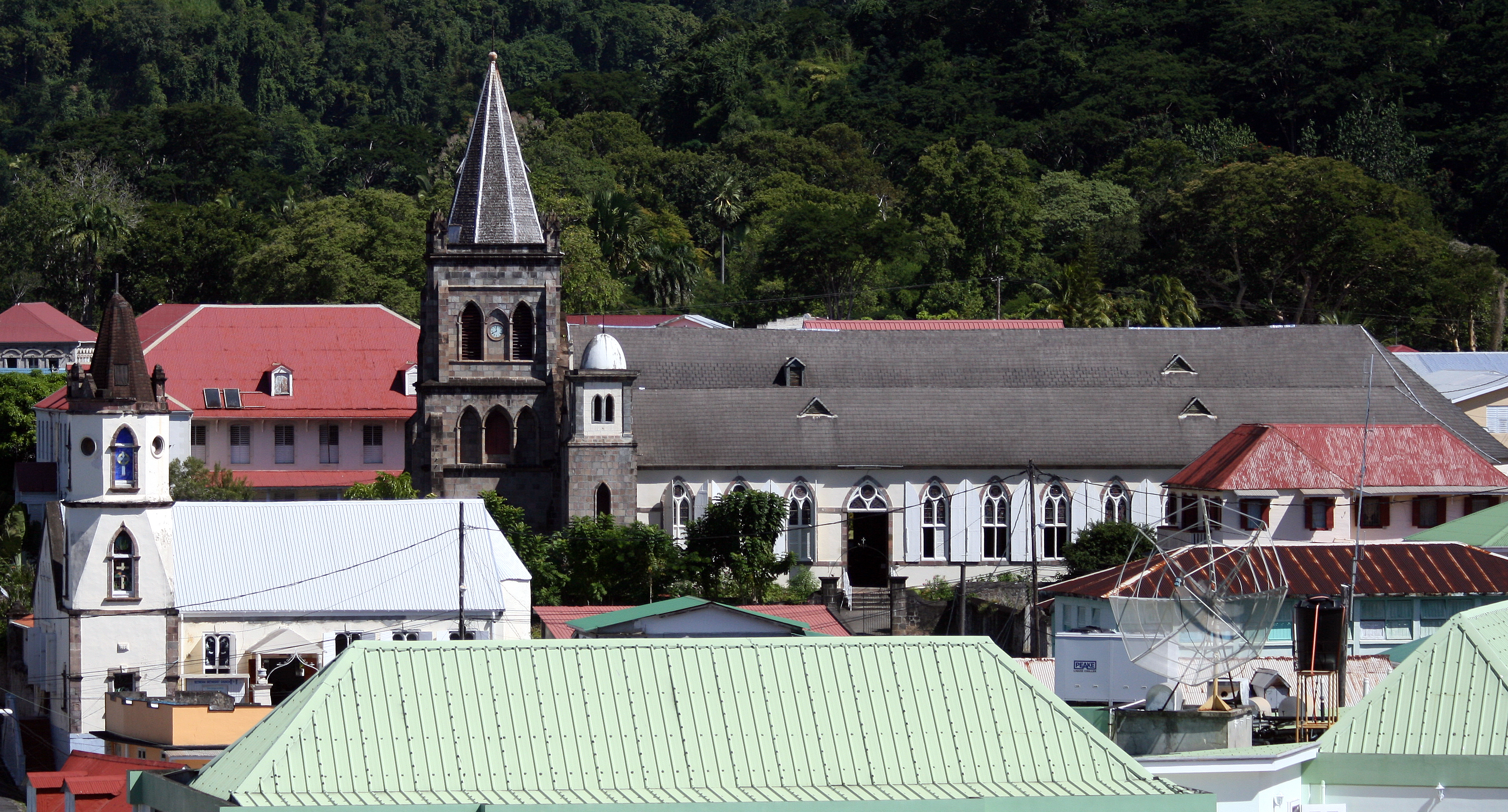
Churches in Roseau, Dominica

The most common religion in Dominica is Christianity, with a majority of practitioners identifying as Catholic. Various minority religious groups are also present on the island.

The constitution of Dominica establishes the freedom of religion.

== Demographics ==
According to the 2011 census, approximately 53% of the population were Catholic; Evangelical Protestants (Pentecostals, Baptists and the Christian Union Mission) made up 20% of the population, while Seventh-day Adventists constituted 7%. Other groups included Anglicans, Methodists, Jehovah's Witnesses, Muslims, Rastafarians, and Baha’is, although 9% of the population professed no religious affiliation.

Estimates in 2022 suggested that Catholics represented 61.4% of the population, Protestants 28.6%, no religion 6.1%, Rastafarians 1.3%, Jehovah's Witnesses 1.2%, “other” 0.3%, and unspecified 1.1%.

== Religious freedom ==
The constitution of Dominica provides for the freedom of religion and thought. This is enforced by the government, although the Rastafarian community objects to the illegal status of marijuana in Dominica, as this plays an important role in their religious practice.

Possession of up to 28 gram (1 oz) of cannabis was legalized in October 2020. Residents of Dominica may grow up to 3 cannabis plants per household.

The government subsidizes the salaries of teachers at private religious schools. Public schools typically include optional non-denominational prayers in morning assemblies.

Religious groups may register with the government in order to receive non-profit status.

In 2023, the country was scored 4 out of 4 for religious freedom.

== See also ==
- Roman Catholicism in Dominica
- Islam in Dominica
- Bahá'í Faith in Dominica
