= Catholic Church in Dominica =

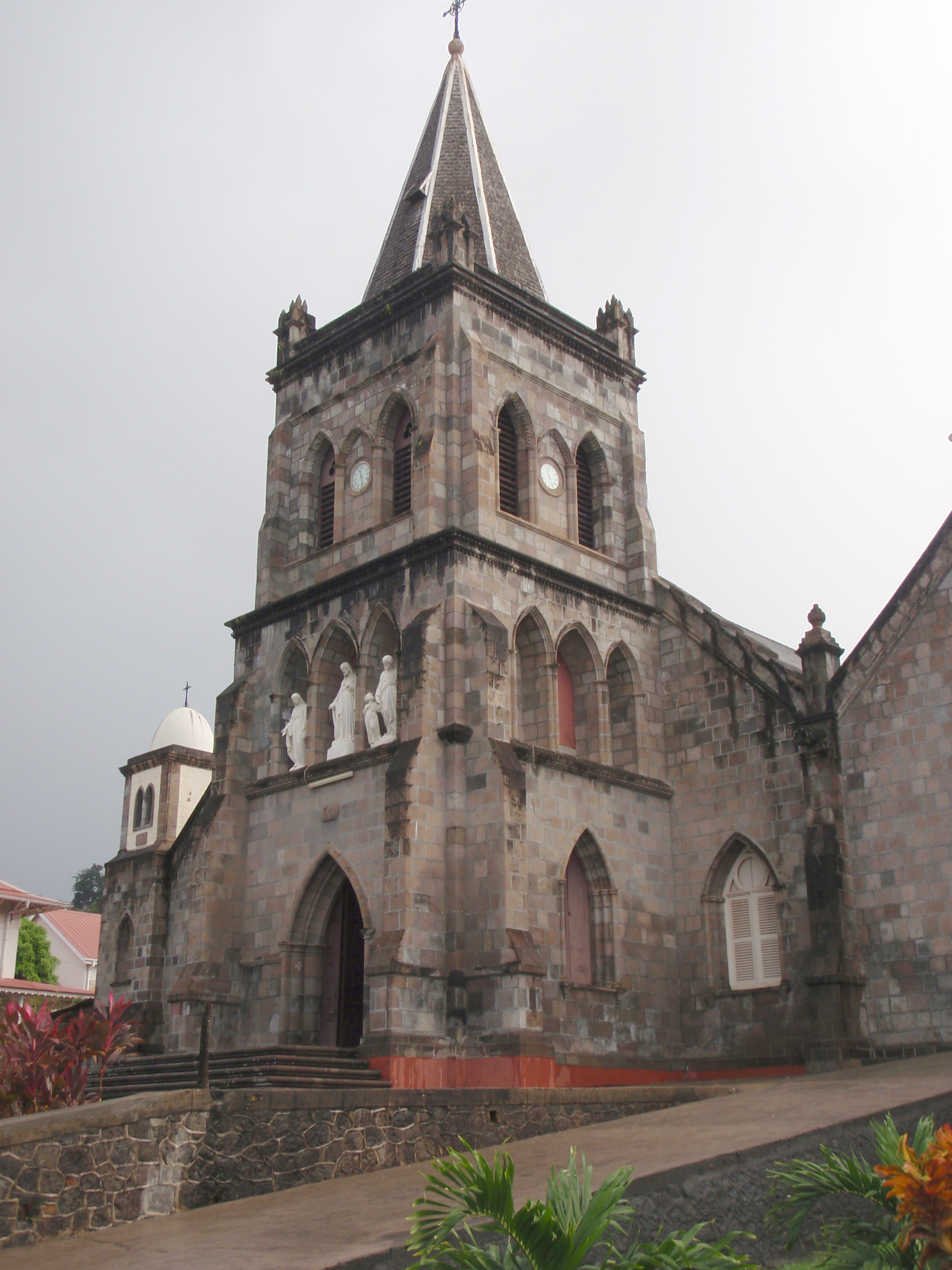
Roseau Cathedral, Dominica

The Catholic Church in Dominica is part of the worldwide Catholic Church, under the spiritual leadership of the Pope in Rome. The entire country is under the jurisdiction of a single diocese, the Diocese of Roseau.

According to the 2011 census, approximately 53% of the population were Catholic. Estimates in 2020 suggested that 60.23% of the population were Catholic, with 27 priests and 9 nuns serving across 15 parishes.

== See also ==
- Religion in Dominica
