= List of companies of Dominica =

Companies in Dominica

Location of Dominica

Dominica is a sovereign island country. Bananas and other agriculture dominate Dominica's economy, and nearly one-third of the labour force works in agriculture. This sector, however, is highly vulnerable to weather conditions and to external events affecting commodity prices. In 2007, Hurricane Dean caused significant damage to the agricultural sector as well as the country's infrastructure, especially roads. In response to reduced European Union (EU) banana trade preferences, the government has diversified the agricultural sector by promoting the production of coffee, patchouli, aloe vera, cut flowers, and exotic fruits such as mango, guava, and papaya.

== Notable firms ==
This list includes notable companies with primary headquarters located in the country. The industry and sector follow the Industry Classification Benchmark taxonomy. Organizations which have ceased operations are included and noted as defunct.

Notable companies Status: P=Private, S=State; A=Active, D=Defunct
| Name | Industry | Sector | Headquarters | Founded | Notes | Status | |
|---|---|---|---|---|---|---|---|
| National Bank of Dominica | Financials | Banks | Roseau | 1976 | Commercial bank | P | A |
| Swisscash | Financials | Equity investment instruments | Roseau | 1948 | Defunct 2007 | P | D |
| The Chronicle (Dominica) | Consumer services | Publishing | Roseau | 1909 | Daily newspaper | P | A |

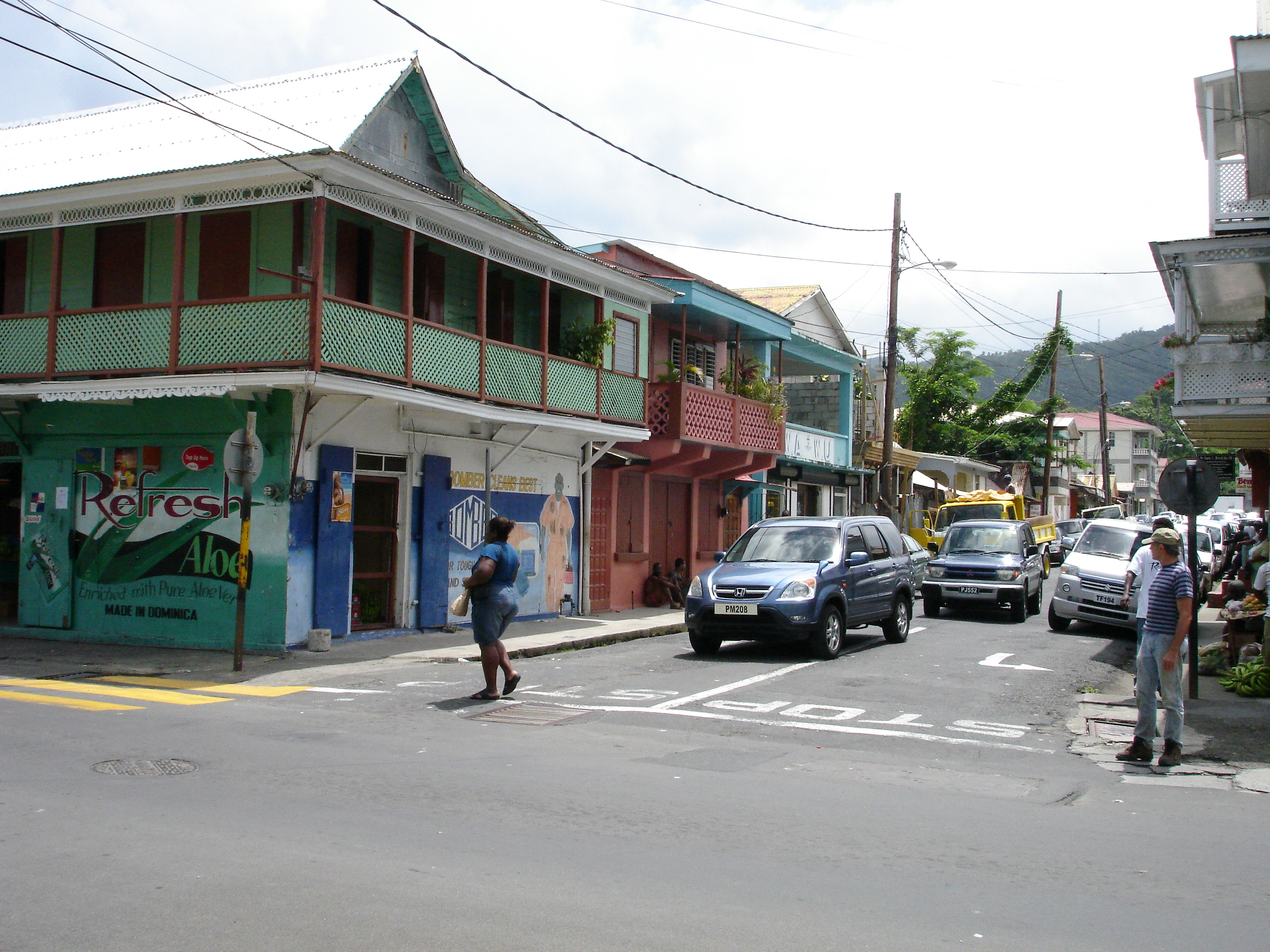
Commercial street in Roseau.

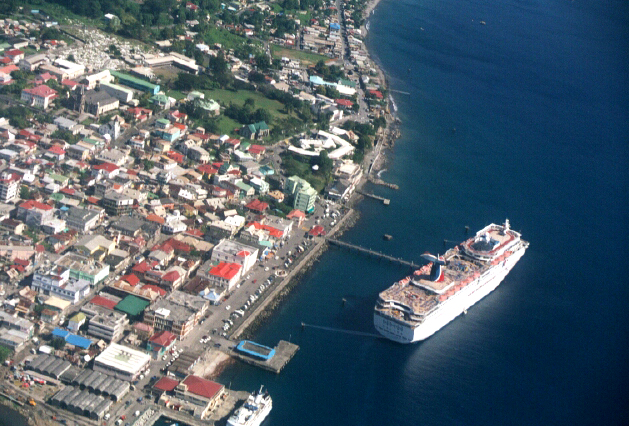
Harbor and cruise terminal at Roseau.

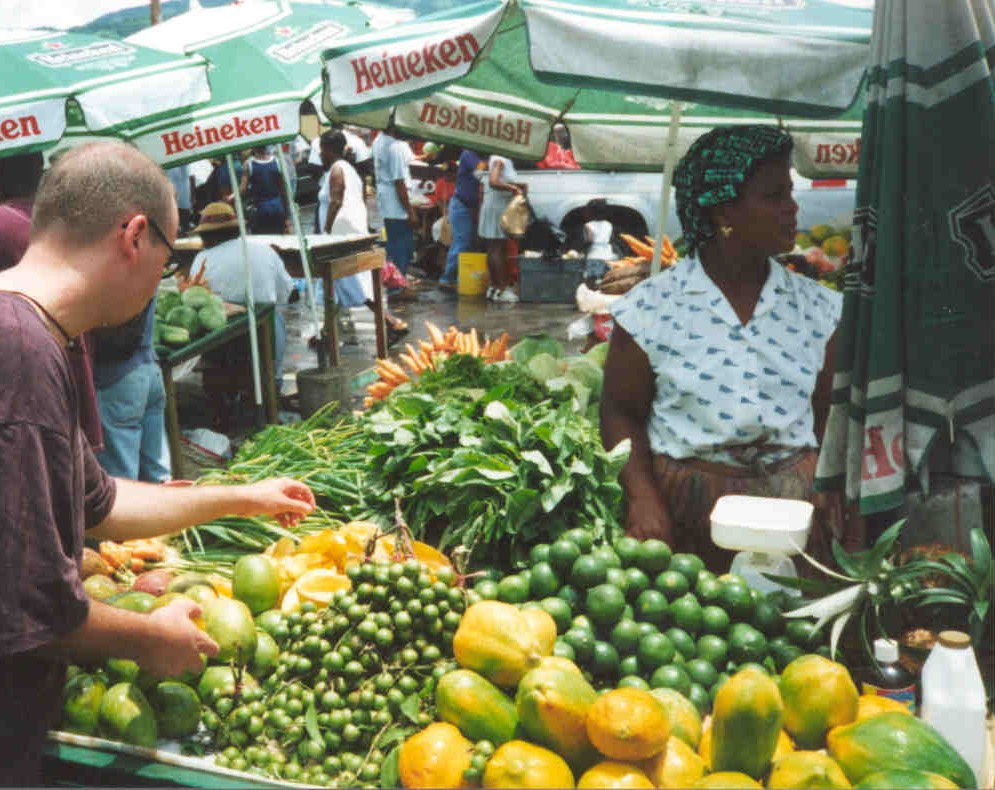
Market in Dominica.
