= Geology of Dominica =

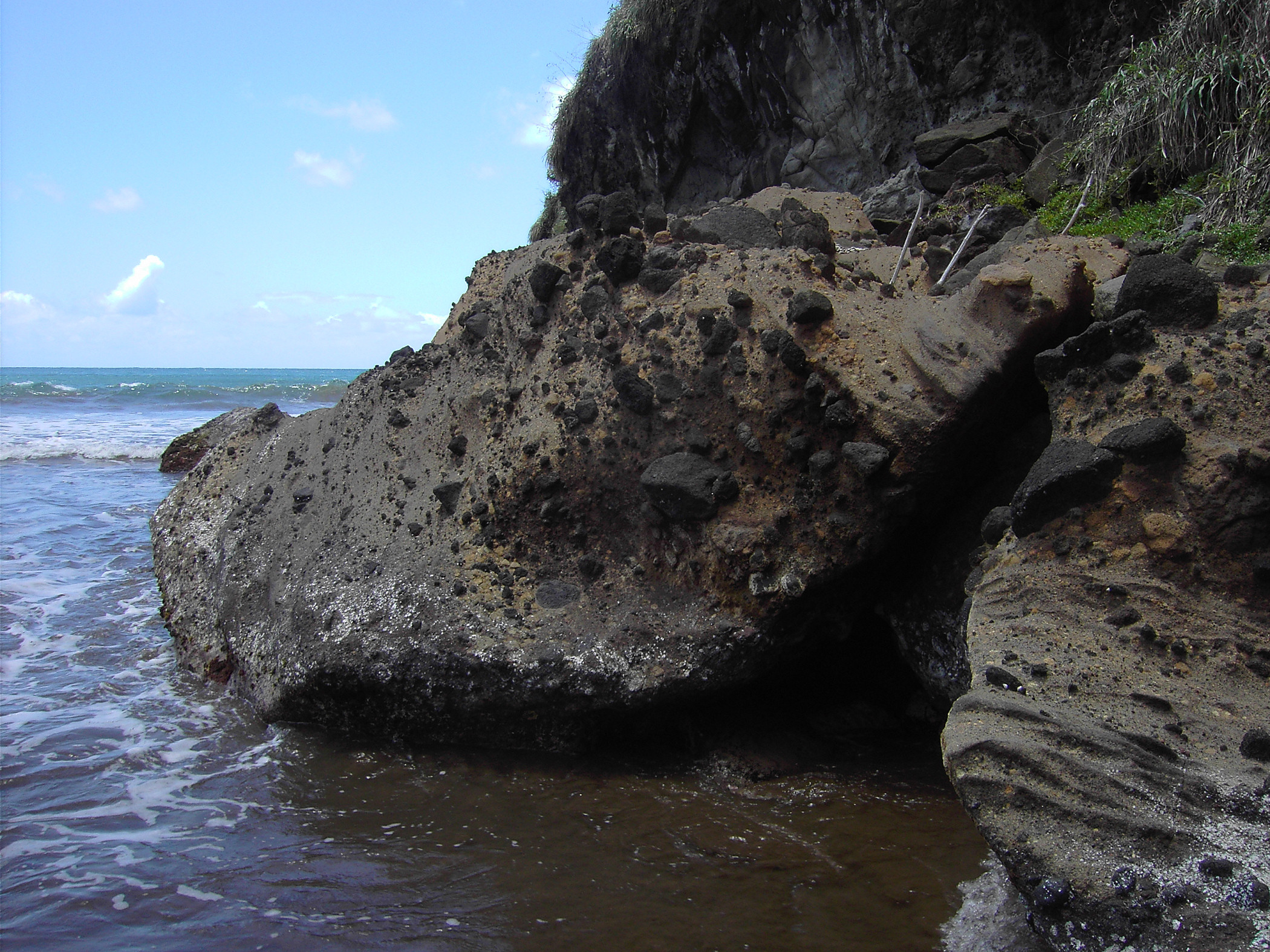
A cliff made of volcanic rock at Pagua Bay, Dominica

The geology of Dominica is part of the broader Lesser Antilles Volcanic Arc, considered a modern example of island arcs that often accreted to continents as exotic terranes. Dominica is located in the center of the chain, with Guadeloupe to the north and Martinique to the south. Pleistocene sediments overlie almost the entire island except for an area of Pliocene exposures in the east. The oldest basement rocks are volcanic basalt deposits from the Eocene.

The country's central spine, a northwest–southeast axis of steep volcanic slopes and deep gorges, generally varies in elevation from 300 to 1,400 metres (984 to 4,593 ft) above sea level. Several east-west trending mountain spurs extend to the narrow coastal plain, which is studded with sea cliffs and has level stretches no wider than 2,000 metres (6,562 ft). The highest peak is Morne Diablotins, at 1,447 metres (4,747 ft); Morne Trois Pitons, with an elevation of 1,423 metres (4,669 ft), lies farther south and is the site of Morne Trois Pitons National Park.

The interior features rugged mountains of volcanic origin. Although scores of mostly mild seismic shocks were recorded in 1986, volcanic eruptions ceased thousands of years ago. Sulfuric springs and steam vents, largely concentrated in the central and southern parts of the island, remain active, however. Volcanism is still quite evident on the island, the most popular examples being Dominica's Boiling Lake and "valley of desolation." The boiling lake (the world's second largest) is within a crater and is fed by a waterfall - the boiling is believed to be caused by the heat of a magma chamber beneath the lake. The valley of desolation is a sulfurous valley of volcanic vents and hot springs that inhibits significant plant growth - in stark contrast to the surrounding rain forest. Technically dormant today, this caldera last erupted in 1880. The area that exploded on 4 January 1880 was reported to be "fully nine square miles".

Dominica's rugged surface is marked by its volcanic past. Rock formations are mainly volcanic andesite and rhyolite, with fallen boulders and sharp-edged protrusions peppering slope bases. The light- to dark-hued clay and sandy soils, derived from the rocks and decomposed vegetation, are generally fertile and porous. Only a few interior valleys and coastal strips are flat enough for soil accumulations of consequence, however.

Dominica is water-rich with swift-flowing highland streams, which cascade into deep gorges and form natural pools and crater lakes. The streams are not navigable, but many are sources of hydroelectric power. Trafalgar Falls, located near the national park, is one of the most spectacular sites on the island. The falls consists of twin waterfalls known as the mother and father or the Mama and the Papa. At the base of each waterfall are natural pools. Locals and tourists alike come here to enjoy the water. At the base of the Papa fall a natural hot spring can also be found which heats a portion of its pool. The principal rivers flowing westward are the Layou and the Roseau, and the major one emptying eastward is the Toulaman. The largest crater lake, called Boeri, is located in the national park. There are 83 "significant" waterways on the island out of a total of 365 with also includes rills and brooks.
