= Dominican College =

Dominican College may refer to:

== Higher education ==
- Dominican University College, in Ottawa, Ontario, Canada
- Dominican University of California, formerly Dominican College, in San Rafael, California, U.S.
- St. Mary's Dominican College, a defunct college in New Orleans, Louisiana, U.S.
- Dominican University New York, formerly Dominican College, a four-year private college in Orangeburg, New York, U.S.
- Dominican College of Racine, a defunct college in Racine, Wisconsin, U.S.

== Other education ==
- Cabra Dominican College, a high school in Adelaide, South Australia, Australia
- Dominican College, Fortwilliam, a grammar school in Belfast, Northern Ireland
- Dominican College, Portstewart, a grammar school on north coast of Northern Ireland
- Dominican College Newbridge, a private secondary school in County Kildare, Ireland
- Dominican College Sion Hill, a girls' secondary school in Blackrock, County Dublin, Ireland
- St Rose's Dominican College, a former girls' school in Belfast, Northern Ireland
- Dominican College, Griffith Avenue, a girls' secondary school in Drumcondra, Dublin, Ireland

== See also ==
- Dominican University (disambiguation)
