= List of newspapers in Dominica =

The West Indian island of Dominica has published various newspapers and periodicals since 1765.

== Background ==
Publishing was introduced to Dominica in the 1760s, shortly after it became a colony of the United Kingdom. The island's first periodical, The Dominica Gazette, was established by English printer William Smith at Charlotte Town (now Newtown) in July 1765.

As Basil E. Cracknell wrote in his 1973 book on the island, "There has been a long succession of newspapers in Dominica, testifying to the keen interest that the islanders, or the educated urban minority, have always taken in affairs." The Dominica Courant, Dominica Tribune, and the Dominica Dial are several of the older titles mentioned in his overview. Cracknell also surmised that an active political scene encouraged competition among four newspapers by publication time. Two of these outlets, the Dominica Herald and The Educator, were edited by politician Star Lestrade.

As of the 2020s, Dominica is served exclusively by weeklies; outside traditional print, local news are provided by Dominica News Online.

== Publications ==
Name	Established	Notes
The Dominica Gazette	July 1765	Official government publication.
The Colonist	Early 19th century	Conserative.
The Dominican	1839	Liberal. Edited by schoolteacher Charles Gordon Falconer.
The People	Late 19th century	Covered "local and island interests".
New Dominican	1871	"Conducted by the [former] editor of the Dominican."
Dominica Guardian	1893	Liberal.
Ecclesiastical Bulletin	1907	Official monthly of the national Catholic movement.
The Chronicle	16 January 1909	Founded by Catholic Bishop Schelfhaut as the Dominica Chronicle, a biweekly published on Wednesdays and Saturdays; rebranded in later decades as the New Chronicle, and in 1996 under its current name. For a brief period in the 1950s, it was the only newspaper in the then-British territory. Listed in Ayer 1914 as "liberal", but variously described later on as "conservative", "apolitical", and "neutral". Europa 2002 reports a shift to "progressive independent" status.
Voice of Dominica	1910	Independent.
Dominica Tribune-Guardian	17 May 1924	Liberal.
Dominica Herald	1955	Edited by poet and author Edward Scobie, and later on by Star Lestrade.
The Star	1965	Edited by Robert and Phyllis Shand Allfrey.
The Educator	1971	Backed by the Dominica Labour Party.
The Tropical Star	Around 1994	
The Independent	Around 1996	
The Sun	1998	

== See also ==
- Telecommunications in Dominica
