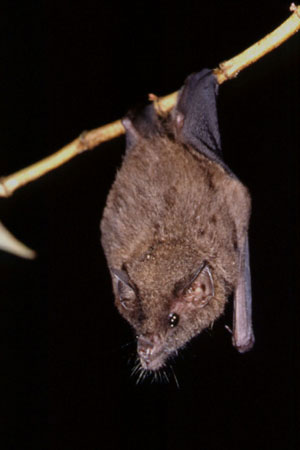
- Geoffroy's tailless bat (Anoura geoffroyi)

Scientific classification
- Domain: Eukaryota
- Kingdom: Animalia
- Phylum: Chordata
- Class: Mammalia
- Order: Chiroptera
- Family: Phyllostomidae
- Subfamily: Glossophaginae; Bonaparte, 1845

Genera
- Anoura Choeroniscus Choeronycteris Dryadonycteris Glossophaga Hylonycteris Leptonycteris Lichonycteris Monophyllus Musonycteris Scleronycteris

= Glossophaginae =

Subfamily of bats

Glossophaginae is a subfamily of leaf-nosed bats.

== List of species ==
Subfamily: Glossophaginae

- Tribe Glossophagini
  - Genus: Anoura - Geoffroy's long-nosed bats
    - Anoura aequatoris
    - Cadena's tailless bat, Anoura cadenai
    - Tailed tailless bat, Anoura caudifera
    - Handley's tailless bat, Anoura cultrata
    - Tube-lipped nectar bat, Anoura fistulata
    - Geoffroy's tailless bat, Anoura geoffroyi
    - Broad-toothed tailless bat, Anoura latidens
    - Luis Manuel's tailless bat, Anoura luismanueli
  - Genus: Choeroniscus
    - Godman's long-tailed bat, Choeroniscus godmani
    - Greater long-tailed bat, Choeroniscus periosus
    - Minor long-nosed long-tongued bat, Choeroniscus minor
  - Genus: Choeronycteris
    - Mexican long-tongued bat (hog-nosed bat), Choeronycteris mexicana
  - Genus: Dryadonycteris
    - Dryades bat, Dryadonycteris capixaba
  - Genus: Glossophaga
    - Commissaris's long-tongued bat, Glossophaga commissarisi
    - Gray long-tongued bat, Glossophaga leachii
    - Miller's long-tongued bat, Glossophaga longirostris
    - Western long-tongued bat, Glossophaga morenoi
    - Pallas's long-tongued bat, Glossophaga soricina
  - Genus: Hylonycteris
    - Underwood's long-tongued bat, Hylonycteris underwoodi
  - Genus: Leptonycteris - Saussure's long-nosed bats
    - Southern long-nosed bat, Leptonycteris curasoae
    - Big long-nosed bat or Mexican long-nosed bat, Leptonycteris nivalis
    - Lesser long-nosed bat or Mexican long-nosed bat, Leptonycteris yerbabuenae
  - Genus: Lichonycteris
    - Dark long-tongued bat, Lichonycteris obscura
    - Pale brown long-nosed bat, Lichonycteris degener
  - Genus: Monophyllus
    - Insular single leaf bat, Monophyllus plethodon
    - Leach's single leaf bat, Monophyllus redmani
  - Genus: Musonycteris
    - Banana bat (Colima long-nosed bat), Musonycteris harrisoni
  - Genus: Scleronycteris
    - Ega long-tongued bat, Scleronycteris ega
