= Long-nosed bat =

Long-nosed bat may refer to:

- Saussure's long-nosed bats or Mexican long-nosed bats, genus Leptonycteris
  - Southern long-nosed bat, Leptonycteris curasoae
  - Big long-nosed bat, greater long-nosed bat or Mexican long-nosed bat, Leptonycteris nivalis
  - Lesser long-nosed bat or Mexican long-nosed bat, Leptonycteris yerbabuenae
- Minor long-nosed long-tongued bat, Choeroniscus minor
- Puerto Rican long-nosed bat, Monophyllus frater

Note the ambiguity of the vernacular name Mexican long-nosed bat.
