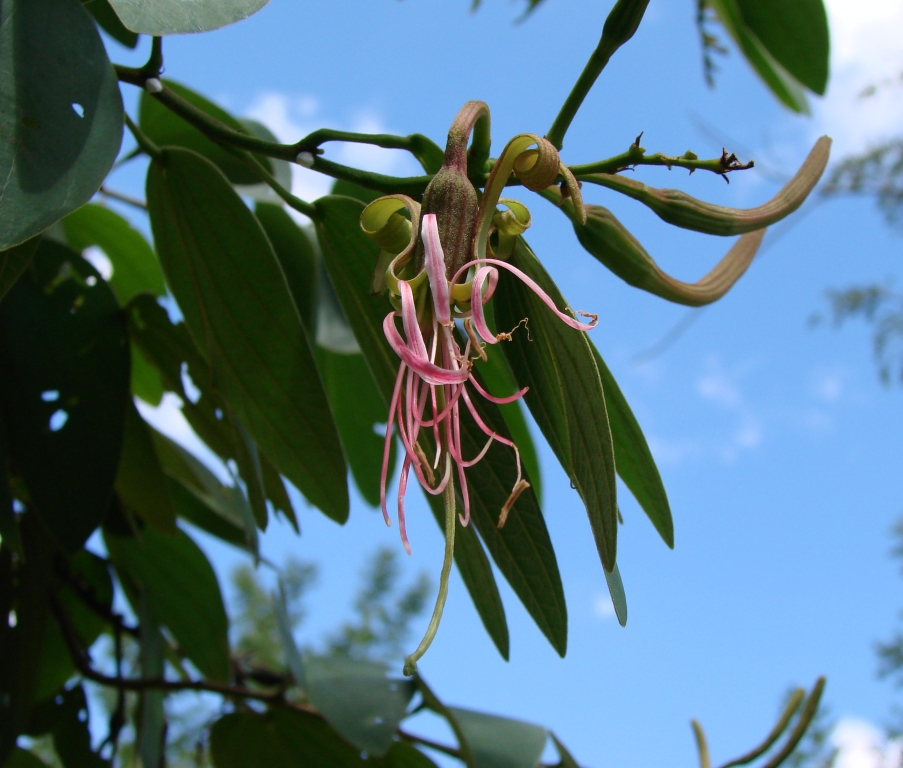

Scientific classification
- Kingdom: Plantae
- Clade: Tracheophytes
- Clade: Angiosperms
- Clade: Eudicots
- Clade: Rosids
- Order: Fabales
- Family: Fabaceae
- Genus: Bauhinia
- Species: B. ungulata

Binomial name
- Bauhinia ungulata L.

Synonyms
- Bauhinia benthamiana Taub.; Bauhinia cavanillei Millsp.; Bauhinia galpinii var. ungulata L.; Bauhinia inermis (Cav.) Pers.; Bauhinia inermis Forssk.; Bauhinia inermis Perr.; Bauhinia macrostachya Benth.; Bauhinia unguiculata Sesse & Moc.; Cansenia ungulata (L.) Raf.; Pauletia inermis Cav.; Pauletia ungulata (L.) A.Schmitz

= Bauhinia ungulata =

Species of legume

Bauhinia ungulata is a shrub species (up to 7 m height) in the tropical Americas, from Mexico to Paraguay. It is commonly found throughout the Brazilian open savannas of Cerrado and Pantanal. Its nocturnal flowers are pollinated by phyllostomid bats, mainly the small Glossophaginae Glossophaga soricina and Anoura caudifer and the Phyllostominae Phyllostomus discolor, which visit the flowers singly or in pairs.

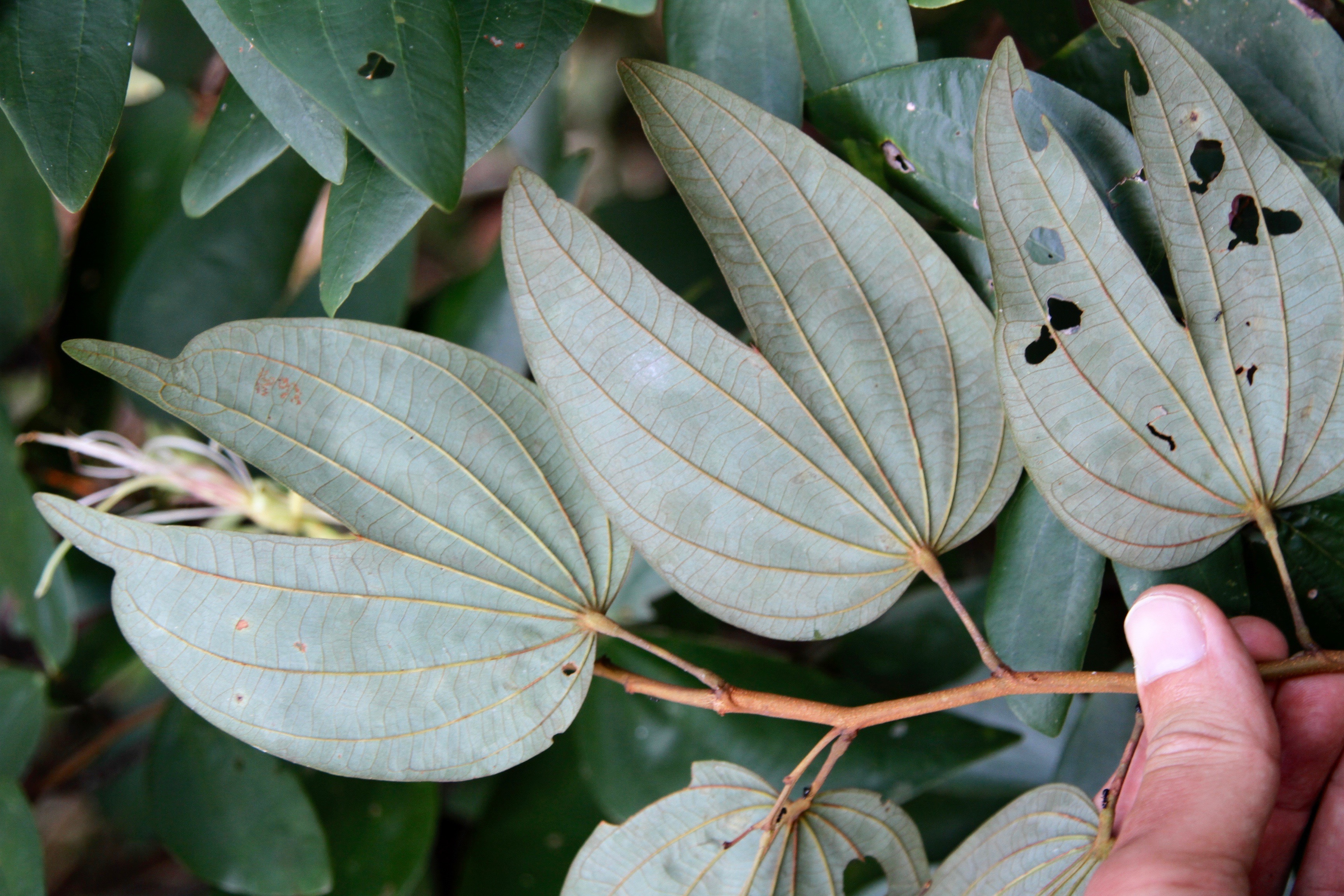
Leaves underside
