= Dryadonycteris capixaba =

Conservation status
- Data Deficient (IUCN 3.1)

Scientific classification
- Kingdom: Animalia
- Phylum: Chordata
- Class: Mammalia
- Order: Chiroptera
- Family: Phyllostomidae
- Genus: Dryadonycteris; Nogueira, Lima, Peracchi, & Simmons, 2012
- Species: D. capixaba

Binomial name
- Dryadonycteris capixaba Nogueira, Lima, Peracchi, & Simmons, 2012
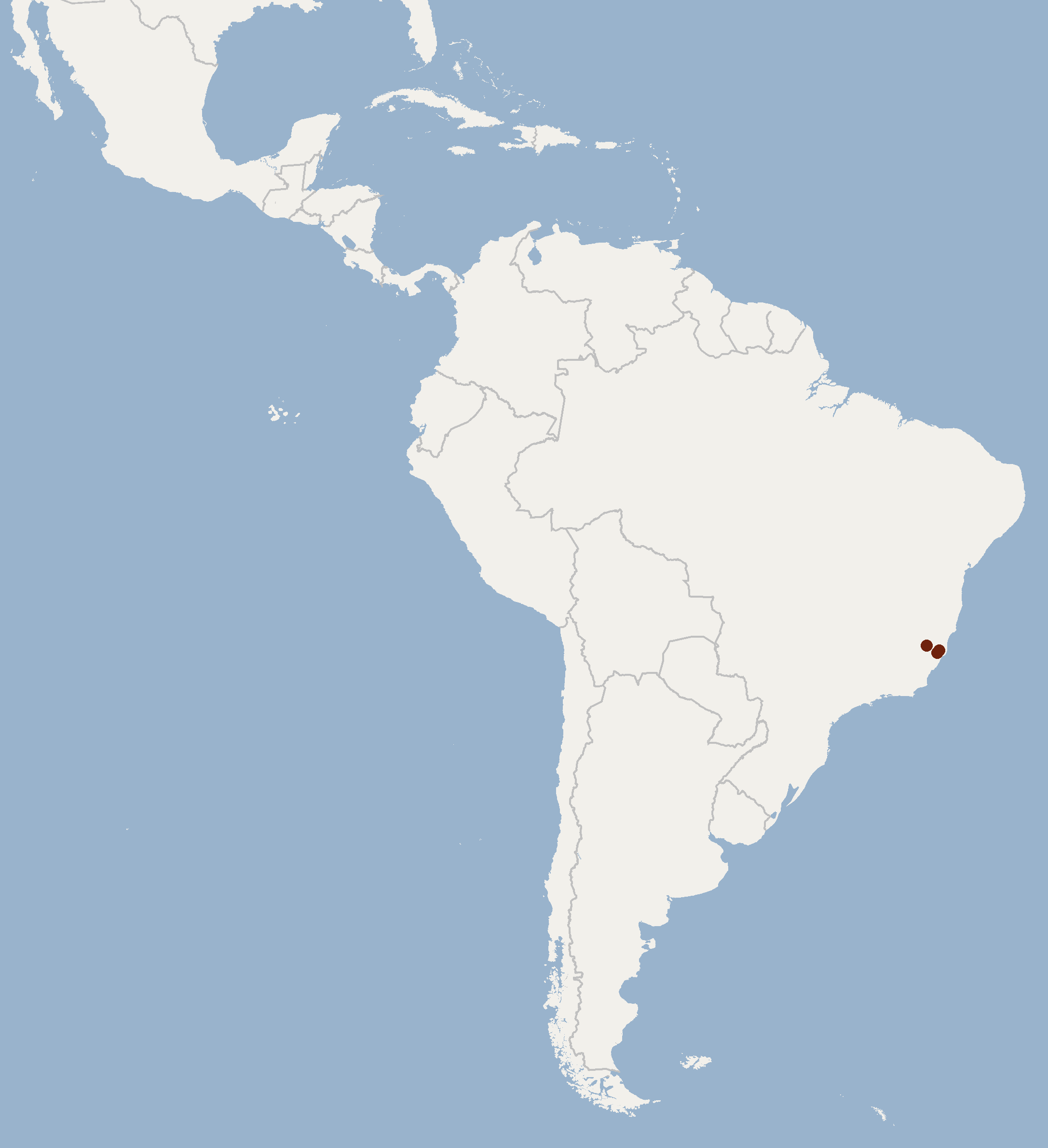
- Range of D. capixaba

Species of bat

Dryadonycteris capixaba is a species of leaf-nosed bat found in South America. It is the only species within the genus Dryadonycteris and sometimes known as the Capixaba nectar-feeding bat.

== Taxonomy and etymology ==
It was described as a new species in 2012. It was described in part from museum specimens that had been identified as the lesser long-tongued bat. The holotype was collected in 2011 in Linhares, Brazil. It is within the subfamily Glossophaginae. The genus name Dryadonycteris was derived from Carl Friedrich Philipp von Martius's name for Atlantic Forest, "Dryades". "Dryades" was derived from Greek dryas, or "wood nymph". "Dryadonycteris" literally means "bat from Dryades", here meaning Atlantic Forest. The species name "capixaba" is from the Tupia language meaning "a native of the state of Espírito Santo."

== Description ==
It is similar in appearance to Lichonycteris and Choeroniscus species. It is a small member of Glossophaginae, with a forearm length of 29–32 mm (1.1–1.3 in). It has a triangular nose-leaf. Its tail is short at about 6.5 mm (0.26 in). It has a dental formula of 2.1.2.30.1.3.3 for a total of 30 teeth.

== Biology and ecology ==
It is nectarivorous.

== Range and habitat ==
It is currently only known from Brazil. It has been documented at elevations of 60 m (200 ft) and 750 m (2,460 ft) above sea level.
