= Ega long-tongued bat =

Conservation status
- Data Deficient (IUCN 3.1)

Scientific classification
- Kingdom: Animalia
- Phylum: Chordata
- Class: Mammalia
- Order: Chiroptera
- Family: Phyllostomidae
- Genus: Scleronycteris; Thomas, 1912
- Species: S. ega

Binomial name
- Scleronycteris ega Thomas, 1912

Species of mammal belonging to the New World leaf-nosed bat family

The Ega long-tongued bat (Scleronycteris ega) is a bat species found in northwestern Brazil and southern Venezuela. It is monotypic within its genus. It is a rare species that has only been confirmed in four localities. It is found in evergreen forests and likely feeds on fruit, pollen, nectar, and insects.
