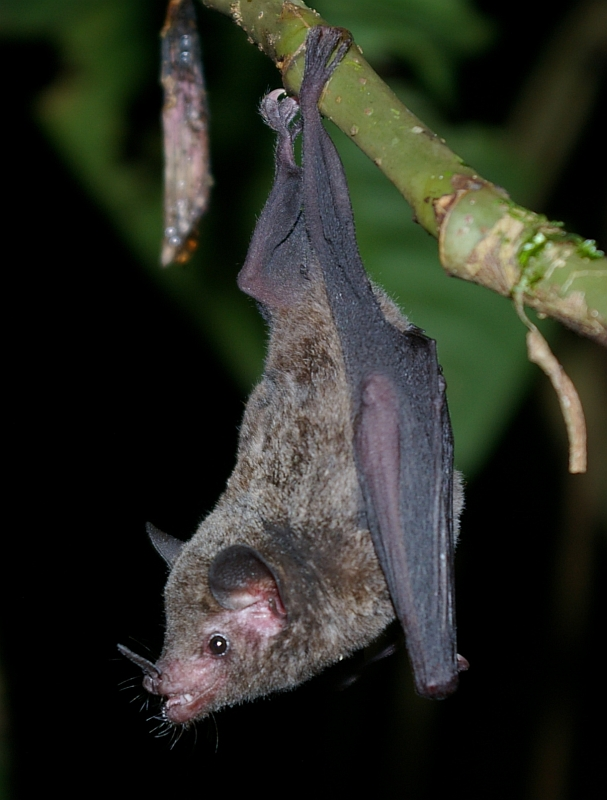

Conservation status
- Least Concern (IUCN 3.1)

Scientific classification
- Kingdom: Animalia
- Phylum: Chordata
- Class: Mammalia
- Order: Chiroptera
- Family: Phyllostomidae
- Genus: Glossophaga
- Species: G. commissarisi

Binomial name
- Glossophaga commissarisi Gardner, 1962
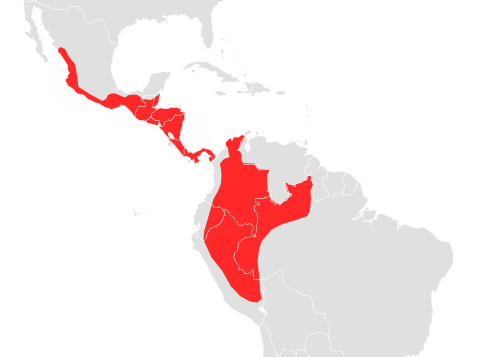
- Commissaris's long-tongued bat range

= Commissaris's long-tongued bat =

Species of bat

Commissaris's long-tongued bat (Glossophaga commissarisi) is a bat species from South and Central America.

== Description ==
The bat's length ranges from 43 to 65 mm, has a wingspan of 32 to 42 mm, and weighs on average 9.3 to 9.5 grams. Colour varies from dark, light, and reddish, brown. The species presents no sexual dimorphism, and has a long tongue with bristle-like papillae.

== Habitat and range ==
It is found from Southern Mexico to Panama, as well as in Guyana. It is found in the lowlands and up to 2,400 metres (7,900 ft). Its habitats range from tropical to sub-tropical.
