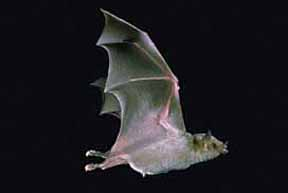
- Greater long-nosed bat (Leptonycteris nivalis)

Scientific classification
- Domain: Eukaryota
- Kingdom: Animalia
- Phylum: Chordata
- Class: Mammalia
- Order: Chiroptera
- Family: Phyllostomidae
- Subfamily: Glossophaginae
- Genus: Leptonycteris; Lydekker, 1891

Type species
- Ischnoglossa nivalis Saussure, 1860

Species
- Leptonycteris curasoae Leptonycteris nivalis Leptonycteris yerbabuenae

= Saussure's long-nosed bat =

Saussure's long-nosed bats

Species of mammals belonging to the New World leaf-nosed bat family

The Saussure's long-nosed bats or Mexican long-nosed bats form the genus Leptonycteris within the leaf-nosed bat family Phyllostomidae. Like all members of the family, they are native to the Americas. According to ITIS, three species are currently recognised, though varying placements of the populations into species and subspecies will be encountered.

== Species ==
The species recognised by ITIS are:

Genus Leptonycteris – Lydekker, 1891 – two species
Common name	Scientific name and subspecies	Range	Size and ecology	IUCN status and estimated population
Southern long-nosed bat	Leptonycteris curasoae Miller, 1900	northern Colombia and Venezuela	Size: Habitat: Diet:	VU
Greater long-nosed bat or Mexican long-nosed bat	Leptonycteris nivalis (Saussure, 1860)	United States (southern Texas, Arizona, and New Mexico), Mexico, Guatemala	Size: Habitat: Diet:	EN
Lesser long-nosed bat or Mexican long-nosed bat	Leptonycteris yerbabuenae Martinez & Villa, 1940	Mexico	Size: Habitat: Diet:	NT

In view of the thorough ambiguity of the term "Mexican long-nosed bat", which can refer to the genus or to either of two of its species, the alternative common names are preferable.

These migratory bats are the main pollinators of several nocturnal blooming cactus species.

== See also ==
- Bats of the United States
