= C. occidentalis =

C. occidentalis may refer to:

- plant
  - Calyptronoma occidentalis, a palm species endemic to Jamaica
  - Canna occidentalis, a garden plant
  - Carex occidentalis, a sedge species
  - Celtis occidentalis, the common hackberry, a tree species native to North America
  - Cephalanthus occidentalis, the buttonbush, a flowering plant species native to eastern and southern North America
  - Cercis occidentalis, the western redbud, a tree native to western North America
- animal
  - Crenadactylus occidentalis, tiny gecko species native to Western Australia

== See also ==
- List of Latin and Greek words commonly used in systematic names
