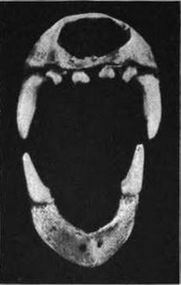

Conservation status
- Least Concern (IUCN 3.1)

Scientific classification
- Kingdom: Animalia
- Phylum: Chordata
- Class: Mammalia
- Order: Chiroptera
- Family: Phyllostomidae
- Genus: Lichonycteris; Thomas, 1895
- Species: L. obscura

Binomial name
- Lichonycteris obscura Thomas, 1895

Synonyms
- Lichonycteris obscurus Miller, 1900

= Dark long-tongued bat =

Species of mammal belonging to the New World leaf-nosed bat family

The dark long-tongued bat (Lichonycteris obscura) is a species of bat from South and Central America. It was formerly considered the only species within the genus Lichonycteris, but is now recognized as one of two species in that genus, along with the pale brown long-nosed bat. It is small species of bat, with adults weighing 6–11 g (0.21–0.39 oz) and having a total length of 46–63 mm (1.8–2.5 in).

The dark long-tongued bat is found in all of Central America south of Chiapas, along with the Andean region of the Amazon versant and the Andes in Venezuela, Colombia, western Ecuador, Peru and Bolivia. It mainly inhabits old-growth forests, but is also found in other habitats. It reproduces during the Neotropical dry season. Embryos can form up to 30% of the female's body weight. The bat's diet consists of nectar, pollen, and insects.

It is classified as being of least concern by the International Union for Conservation of Nature (IUCN) due to its large range and presence in protected areas. However, the Ecuadorian Red List of Mammals lists it as being vulnerable.

== Taxonomy and systematics ==
The dark long-tongued was described by the British mammalogist Oldfield Thomas in 1895 as Lichonycteris obscura, on the basis of a specimen from Managua, Venezuela. The generic name Lichonycteris is from the Greek words lichas, meaning hanging on the cliff, and nycteris, meaning bat. The specific epithet obscura is from the Latin word obscura, meaning dark-colored.

The dark long-tongued bat is one of two species in the genus Lichonycteris. The other species in the genus, the pale brown long-nosed bat, was formerly considered to be conspecific (the same species as) with the dark long-tongued bat, and was occasionally included as a subspecies of the latter. Both species in Lichonycteris are part of a highly specialized group of glossophagines in the subtribe Choeronycterina. It has no recognized subspecies.

== Description ==
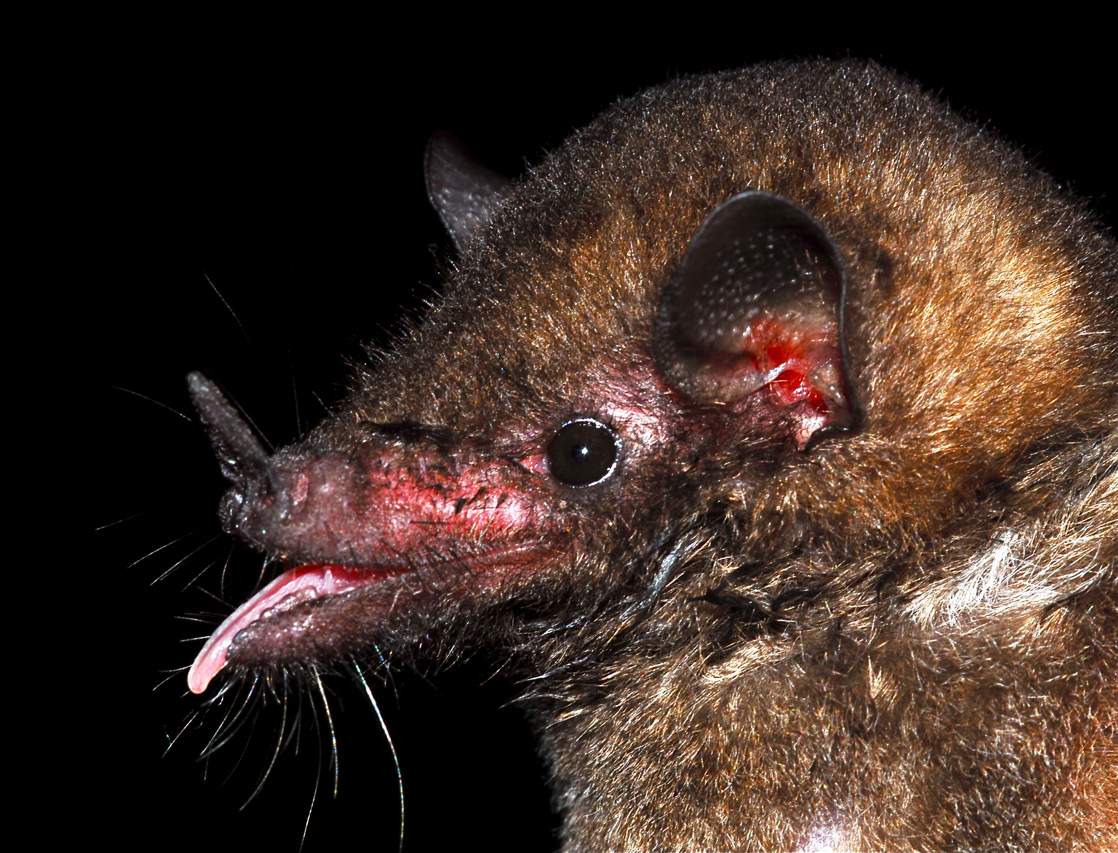
A species of Lichonycteris

The dark long-tongued bat is a small species of bat, with a forearm length of 29.8–35.5 mm (1.17–1.40 in), a tail length of 6–11 mm (0.24–0.43 in) and a total length of 46–63 mm (1.8–2.5 in). Adults weigh 6–11 g (0.21–0.39 oz).

Its hair is tricolored, with a narrow dark brown basal band in the dorsal fur, and a slightly darker dorsum. The wing membrane is attached to the feet at around half the length of the metatarsals. The elbow and the thumb's metacarpal is densely furred. The tail extends to the knees, and the tip rises up from the well-developed tail membrane, which is attached to the ankles. The nose-leaf is small and shaped like an equilateral triangle, with conspicuous whiskers. The calcar is characteristically long and is almost the length of the foot. The dark long-tongued bat has a robust and elongated snout, with a longer lower jaw that causes the lower lip to extend as a slip. The lower incisors are absent. The dental formula is 2.1.2.20.1.3.2, with 26 total teeth.

The dark long-tongued bat may be confused with the lesser long-tongued bat, Godman’s long-tailed bat, and Ega long-tongued bat, but can be distinguished from these and other species of Choeronycterini by its two upper molars, tricolored dorsal fur with a dark basal band, the well-furred elbow, and the length of the wing membrane. It is also similar to the Capixaba nectar-feeding bat, but lacks the anteriorly inflated snout and well-developed premaxillae of the latter, and also differs in the position of the upper incisors and has three upper molars, against two for the Capixaba nectar-feeding bat.

== Biology ==
Foliage is used as a day roost by the dark long-tongued bat. Crevices under fallen trees near streams are also used as temporary roosts. These are frequently used by migrating bats in Costa Rica due to their incidence and the access that they offer to areas that have high levels of food availability for short periods of time.

=== Reproduction ===
The dark long-tongued bat reproduces during the dry season in the Neotropics. Females with embryos have been reported from Mexico in May, from Guatemala in February, from Costa Rica and Venezuela in March, and from Brazil in August. Lactating females have been reported from Costa Rica in January, and from Ecuador in October. Embryos can weigh as much as 30 percent of the female's body weight. Male testicles range in size from 1–3 mm (0.039–0.118 in).

=== Diet ===
The dark long-tongued bat feeds on nectar, pollen, and insects. It pollinates Marcgravia lianas and Vriesea bromeliads, and is an important pollinator of the cactus Weberocereus tunilla. It has also been observed feeding on Ceiba pentandra, Matisia ochrocalyx, Matisia bracteolosa, Quararibea cordata, Quararibea parvifolia, Ochroma pyramidale, Markea neurantha, Mucuna holtonii, Calyptrogyne ghiesbreghtiana, and species in the genus Musa and the family Urticaceae. In Mexico, the majority of stomach content is pollen from Lonchocarpus plants. The presence of Melastomataceae seeds in the feces of individuals from Guatemala suggests that the dark-long tongued bat may be a seed disperser there. In areas of Costa Rica where the bat is a seasonal visitor, it shares its feeding niche with the Commissaris’s long-tongued bat and Underwood’s long-tongued bat.

== Distribution and habitat ==
The dark long-tongued bat is found from southern Chiapas in Mexico south through all of Central America. In South America, it if found in the Andean region of the Amazon versant from Venezuela, Guyana, Suriname, and French Guiana to the Amazon Basin in Brazil. It occurs on the Pacific slope of the Andes in Venezuela, Colombia, and western Ecuador, and on the Amazonia slope in Peru and Bolivia. It is found at elevations of up to 1,000 m (39,000 in).

The dark long-tongued bat mainly occurs in old-growth vegetation such as rainforest, savannas, and tropical deciduous forest. However, it is also known to inhabit dry shrubland in French Guiana, disturbed habitat, open grasslands, and buildings in Nicaragua, fruit groves in Panama, logged forest in Venezuela, open clearings in Peru, banana and rubber groves in Guatemala, and mosaic forest in Brazil. Foliage is used as a day roost in Costa Rica.

== Status ==
The dark long-tongued bat is listed as being of least concern by the IUCN on the IUCN Red List, due to its widespread distribution and presence in protected areas. However, the species is naturally uncommon where it occurs. It is listed as being vulnerable on the Red List of Ecuadorian Mammals. Threats to the bat include deforestation and habitat fragmentation.
