= Calyptronoma plumeriana =

Conservation status
- Least Concern (IUCN 3.1)

Scientific classification
- Kingdom: Plantae
- Clade: Tracheophytes
- Clade: Angiosperms
- Clade: Monocots
- Clade: Commelinids
- Order: Arecales
- Family: Arecaceae
- Genus: Calyptronoma
- Species: C. plumeriana

Binomial name
- Calyptronoma plumeriana (Mart.) Lourteig

Synonyms
- List: Geonoma plumeriana Mart.; Calyptrogyne plumeriana (Mart.) Roncal; Geonoma dulcis C.Wright ex Griseb.; Calyptronoma dulcis (C.Wright ex Griseb.) H.Wendl.; Calyptronoma intermedia H.Wendl.; Geonoma intermedia (H.Wendl.) B.S.Williams; Calyptrogyne dulcis (C.Wright ex Griseb.) M.Gómez; Calyptrogyne clementis León; Calyptrogyne intermedia M.Gómez ex Léon; Calyptrogyne microcarpa León; Calyptronoma clementis (León) A.D.Hawkes; Calyptronoma microcarpa (León) A.D.Hawkes; Calyptronoma clementis subsp. orientensis O.Muñiz & Borhidi

Species of palm

Calyptronoma plumeriana is a pinnately compound leaved palm species which is native to Cuba and Hispaniola (both Haiti and the Dominican Republic).

== Description ==
C. plumeriana stems grow singly and reach heights of 4–10 m (13–33 ft), with stems 10–20 cm (3.9–7.9 in) in diameter. It grows in wet areas near the banks of streams at elevations above 450 m (1,480 ft) above sea level; below 450 meters on Hispaniola, it is replaced by the related Calyptronoma rivalis.

== Use ==
The petals of the staminate flowers are sometimes collected and eaten.
