= Avian foraging =

Methods birds use to find food

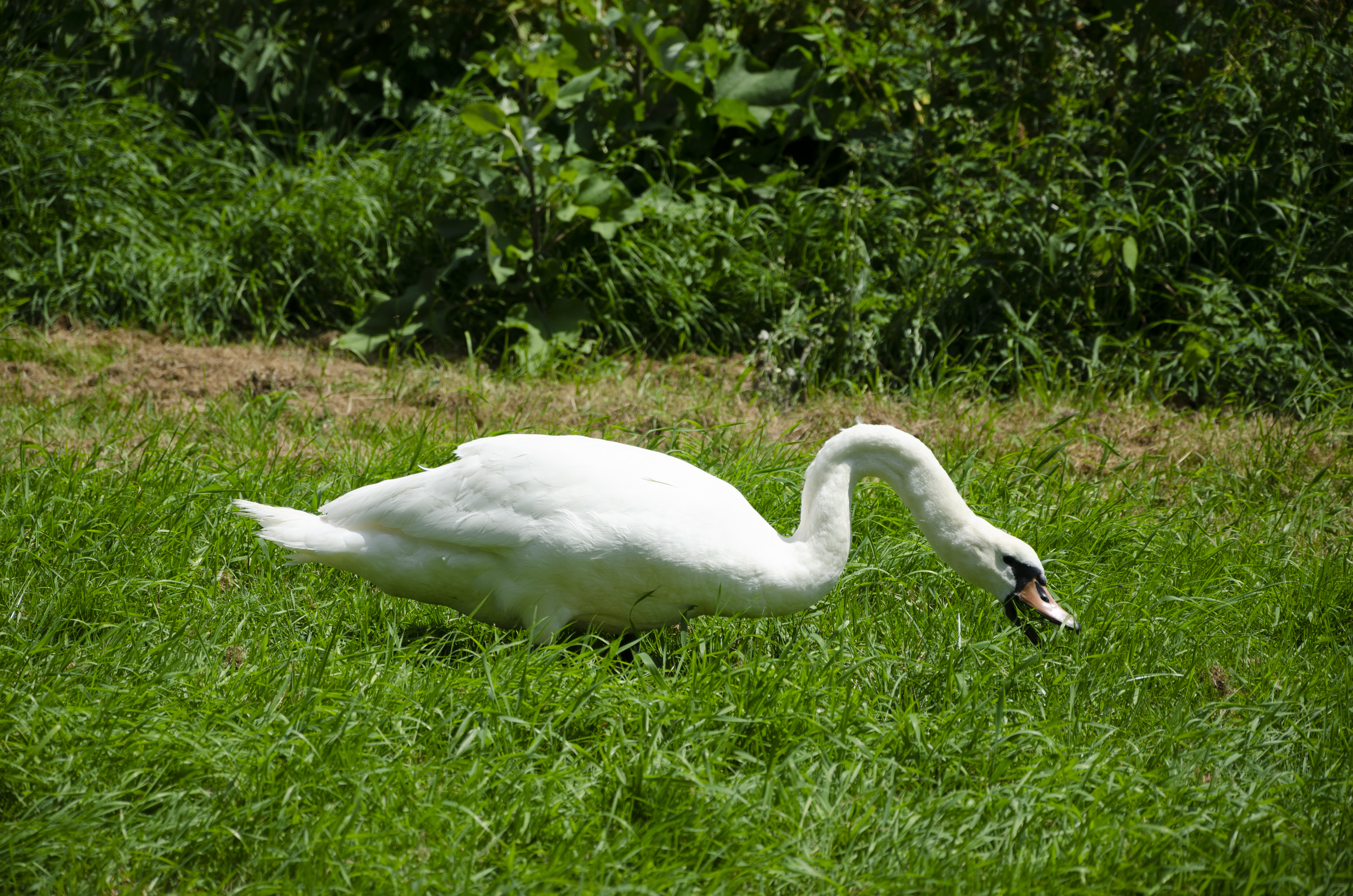
A mute swan (Cygnus olor) grazing

Avian foraging can be defined as the processes and behaviours that birds use to find food. In addition to their unique body adaptations, birds have a range of described behaviours that differ from the foraging behaviours of other animal groups. According to the foraging habitat, birds may be grouped into foraging guilds.

Foraging includes a range of activities, starting with the search for food, making use of sensory abilities, and which may involve one or more birds either of a single or even of multiple species. This is followed by locomotion and movements to obtain or capture the food, followed by the processing or handling of the foods prior to ingestion.

As with all organisms, foraging in birds requires balancing the energy spent (in search, locomotion, avoiding predators, handling food) and energy gained. The high metabolic rate of birds, among the highest for warm-blooded animals, constrains them to ensure a net positive gain in energy and have led evolutionary ethologists to develop the idea of optimal foraging.

== Foraging strategies in birds ==
Birds exhibit a number of behavioural and physiological adaptations to maximize the efficiency of their foraging. For example, many birds with laterally-placed eyes are able to forage and scan for predators simultaneously, reducing the amount of time spent solely on antipredator behaviours. Birds also frequently forage in flocks, which could allow for more efficient foraging under any of the "many-eyes" hypothesis, selfish herd theory, or risk dilution behaviour. Bird species which live in communal roosts may also exchange information about food patch quality location of resources.

Birds likely also select which food items to eat based on both the availability of food and the ratio of overall energy gained from a food item to the handling time required to consume it.

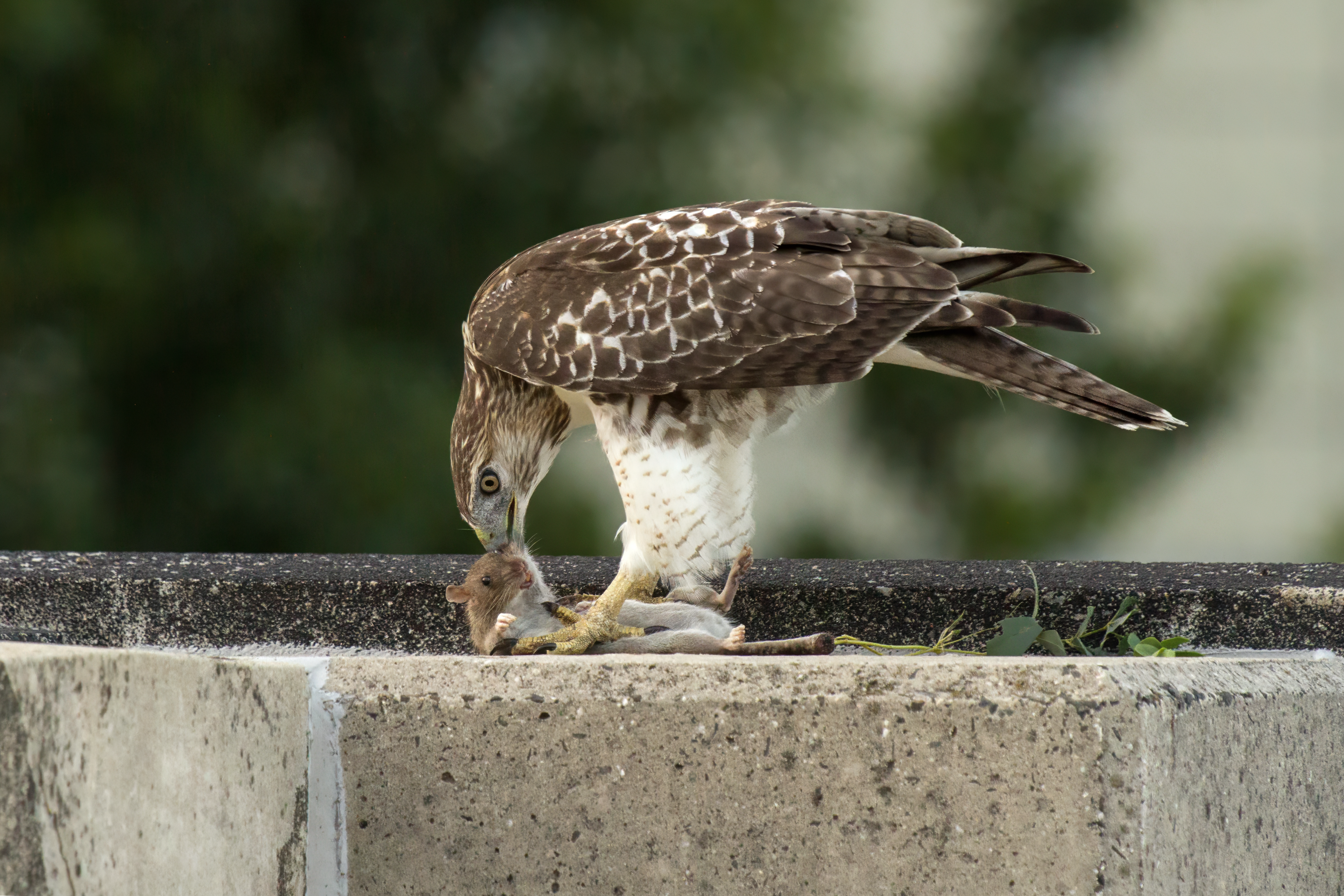
The carnivorous red-tailed hawk (Buteo jamaicensis) with a brown rat (Rattus norvegicus)

== Foraging guilds ==
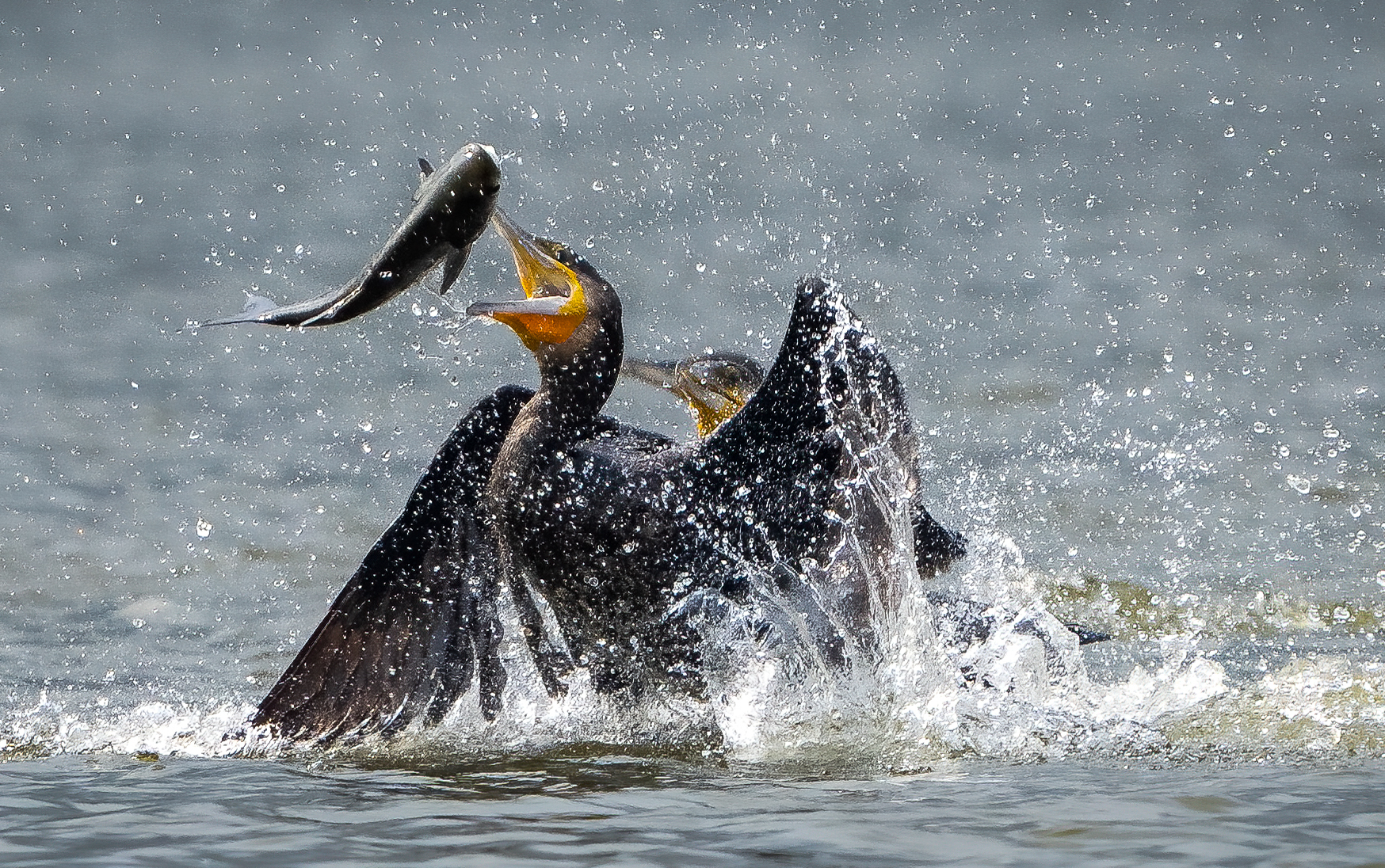
The piscivorous great cormorant (Phalacrocorax carbo) catches a fish.

Assemblages of bird species that share common foraging habitats and food type, and to some extent foraging technique, are conceptually grouped in foraging or trophic guilds. Various attempts have been made to classify foraging guilds for ecological studies and universal and undisputed classifications do not exist. Species may belong to multiple foraging guilds depending on season or habitat (e.g., wintering birds may have different diets and foraging strategies than breeding birds).

Specific classifications are used in ecological and behavioural studies, and are often made according to multiple hierarchical criteria. A full classification may include multiple terms. For example, Airola & Barrett describe the mountain chickadee (Poecile gambeli) as a forest insect-gleaner, primarily using both branches and twigs. These descriptions can becomes unruly when a bird has multiple foraging habitats or prey types – the white-browed wagtail (Motacilla maderaspatensis) is described as an "aquatic-terrestrial-herbivore-insectivore-granivore." These guild descriptors may include feeding-style (e.g., gleaning, probing), prey types (e.g., insectivore), foraging substrate (e.g., subcanopy, bark, mud), habitat (e.g., aquatic, terrestrial), and foraging times (i.e., diurnal, nocturnal, crepuscular).

Guild classification based on food/prey type:

- Carnivore – consumes primarily animal tissue (sometimes delimited to vertebrate animals in the interest of excluding insectivores)
  - Crustaceovore – consumes primarily crustaceans
  - Insectivore – consumes primarily insects
  - Molluscivore – consumes primarily molluscs
  - Piscivore – consumes primarily fish
  - Vermivore – primarily consumes worms, especially annelids
  - Sanguinivore – primarily consumes blood (e.g., oxpeckers, vampire ground finch)
  - Scavengers – primarily consumes carrion (e.g., vultures)
- Herbivore – consumes primarily plant material (often delimited to leaves, stems and roots to exclude specialists listed below)
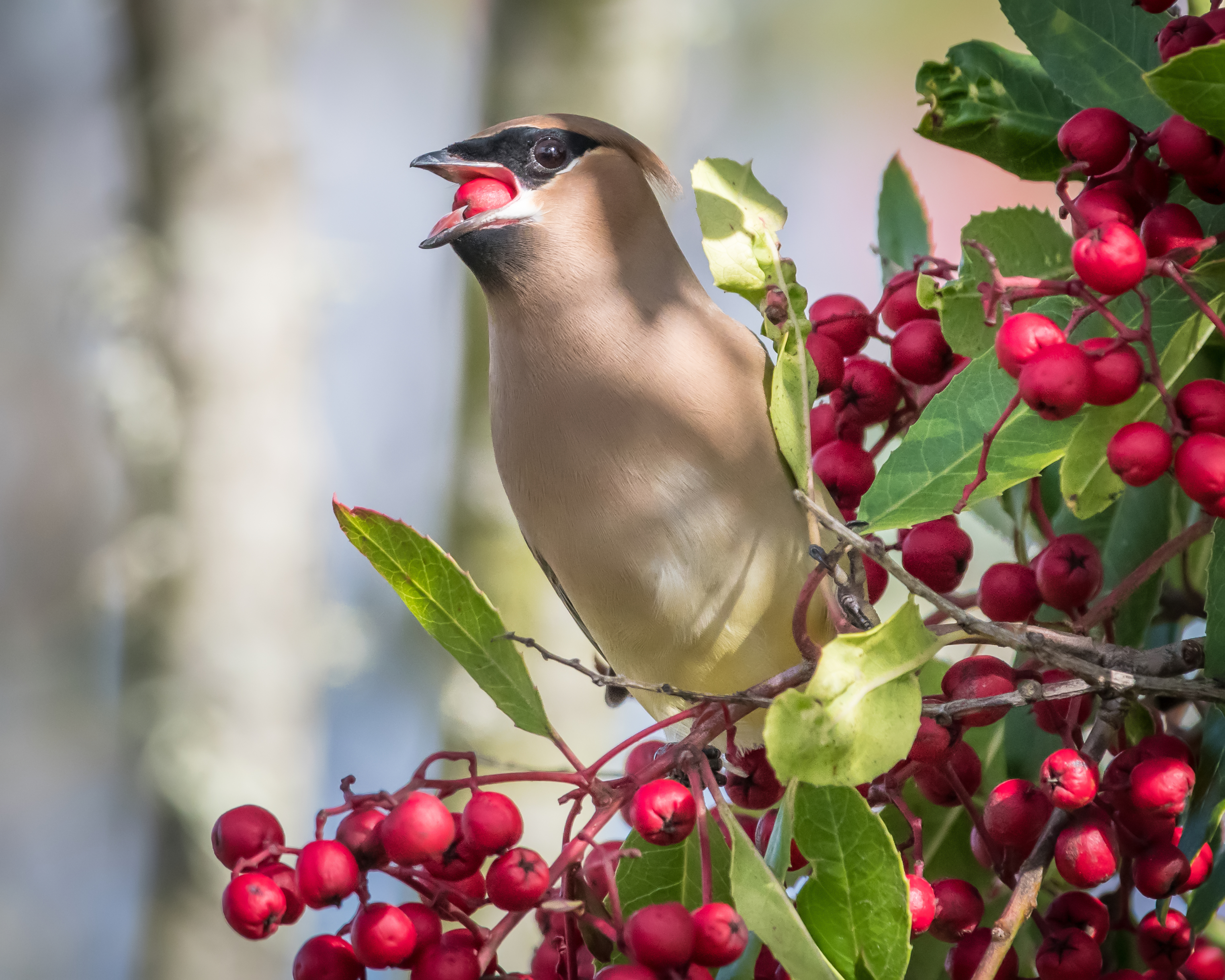
  - The frugivore, cedar waxwing (Bombycilla cedrorum)
    Frugivore – consumes primarily fruit
  - Granivore – consumes primarily seeds or nuts
  - Nectarivore – consumes primarily nectar (e.g. hummingbirds)
- Omnivore – eats a variety of foods, including both animal and plant material (whereby the less consumed material makes up >10% of total diet)

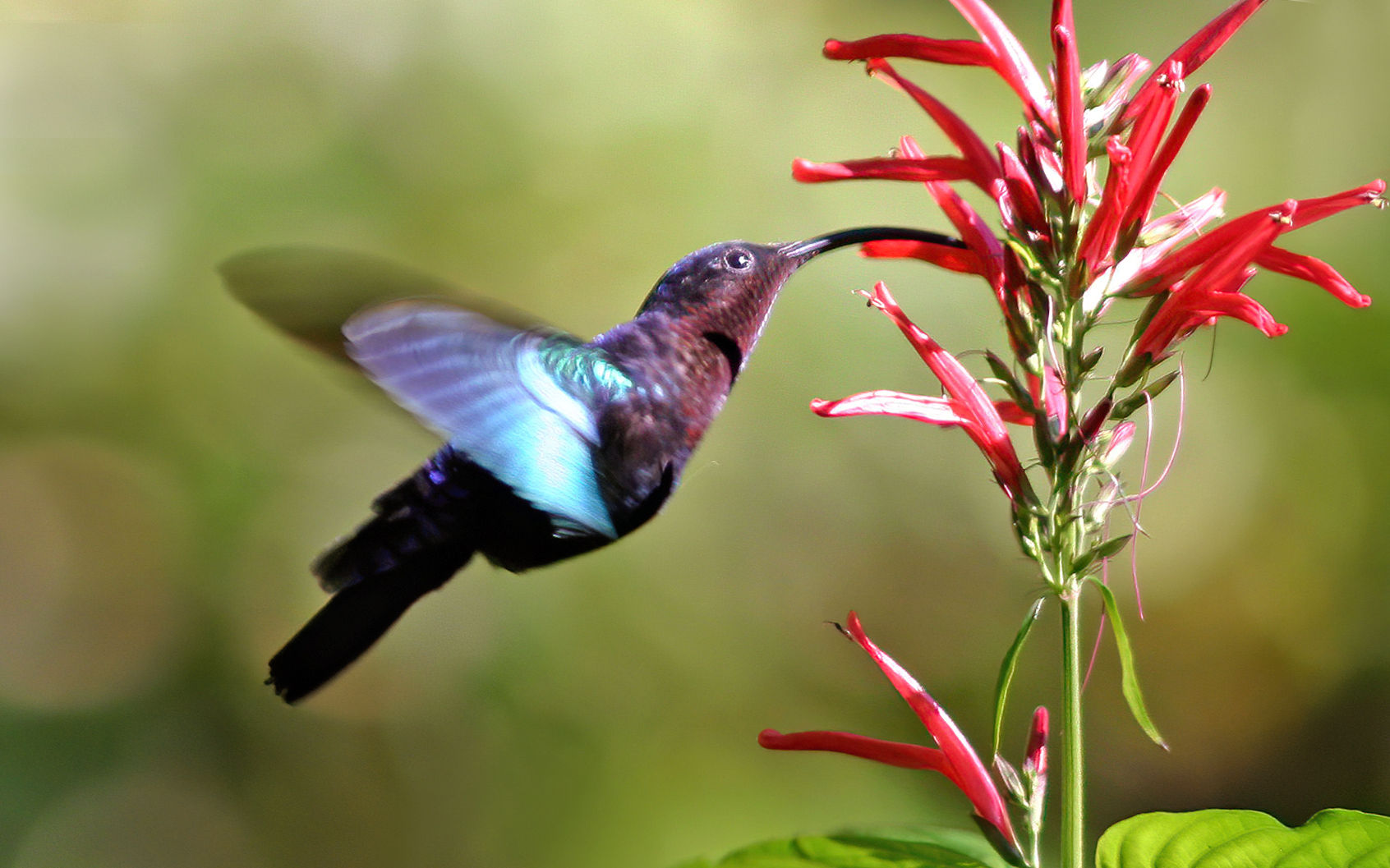
The nectarivore purple-throated carib (Eulampis jugularis) eats nectar from a flower

Guild classification based on foraging habitat/substrate:

- aerial (food is caught mid-air)
- ground (food is foraged from the ground or from very low vegetation)
- arboreal (food is collected from various portions of a plant, generally a tree or shrub)
  - bark (on/in/under tree bark)
  - floral (on/in flowers)
  - upper canopy (from leaves/twigs/branches of trees' upper canopy)
  - lower canopy/shrub (from leaves/twigs/branches of trees' understory or from shrubs and saplings)
- dead leaves (foraging primarily from leaf litter, either in the canopy or understory of forests)
- grass/forbs (food is collected from smaller plants in the understory or in open habitats)
- water (brackish, freshwater or saltwater environments)
  - water surface (collecting food from the surface of the water)
  - water bottom (collecting food from below water's surface, via dabbling, diving)
  - coastal (brackish and saltwater habitats near a coast)
    - coastal beach (foraging in tidal flats or beaches)
    - coastal rock (foraging on rocky outcroppings along coast)
  - freshwater (foraging in ponds, lakes, rivers, streams)
    - freshwater shoreline (foraging on banks or shore of a freshwater habitat)
  - marshes (foraging in a wetland habitat, can be subdivided into freshwater/saltwater/brackish types)
  - mud (inland mudflats such as flooded agricultural fields or meadows)
  - pelagic (foraging in the open ocean, not near a coast)

Western reef heron (Egretta gularis) foot stirring

Guild classifications based on foraging technique:

- Ambushing – waiting for prey to come within reach, may involve slow walking
  - Baiting – use of a lure to attract prey. Some herons species drop feathers or small objects on the water surface, which will attract fish to come within the bird's striking range. Burrowing owls use dung to attract beetles.
  - Foot stirring/raking – use of the feet to disturb aquatic sediment in order to reveal prey.
  - Foot paddling – behaviour unique to gulls. Involves a rapid, up-and-down movement of the feet which may flush or reveal prey.
- Foot trembling – used primarily by phalaropes and other waders, involves stirring water or mud to make a vortex, which catches and concentrates prey.
  Hartlaub's gulls (Chroicocephalus hartlaubii) foot paddling
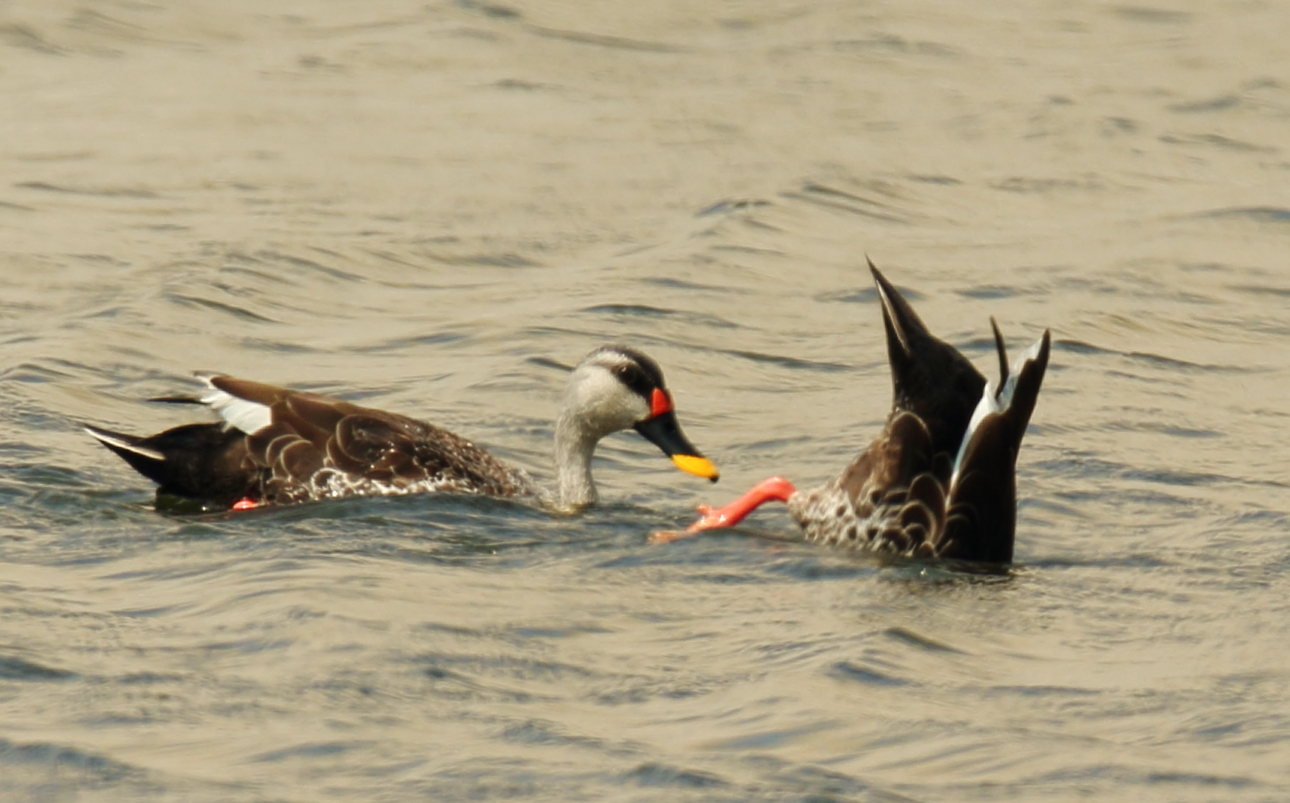
- Indian spot-billed duck (Anas poecilorhyncha) dabbling
  Dabbling – in aquatic birds, involves dipping the head or neck under water
- Plunging – diving from air into water to capture prey with open mouth
- Foot plunging – involves plunging from the air to the water or ground surface to seize prey using the feet
- Skimming – flying low over water to pick food items from surface using lower bill
- Diving – in aquatic birds, completely submerging the body in search of food
- Screening – flying with open bill to capture aerial prey
- Excavating – in arboreal birds, finds food in tree by drilling a hole
- Scaling – feeding under bark by removing or prying bark (may have different forms, including "chiseling" or "flaking"
- Gaping – inserting bill into substrate and then opening apart the bill to pry
- Scratching – to remove a layer of substrate (often leaf litter or snow) using the feet
- Grubbing – digging in soil to access roots or tubers
- Gleaning – picking specific items from the surface of the substrate
  - Hover-gleaning – picking specific items while flying
- Grazing – feeding on grasses, sedges, or their seeds in fields or meadows
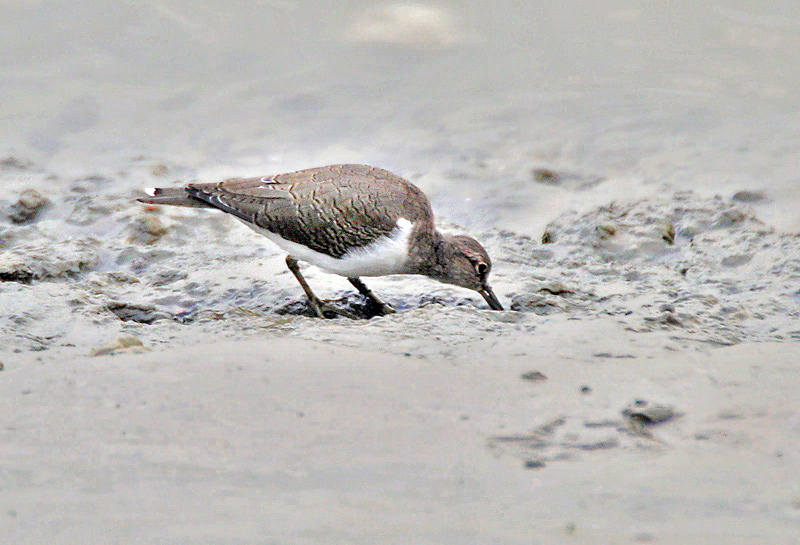
- Common sandpiper (Actitis hypoleucos) probing for food in sand
  Probing – inserting bill into substrate (e.g., mud, sand, ground) and using touch to detect prey
- Straining – strain food from water or mud using special structures in the bill
- Piracy or Kleptoparasitism – harassing other birds to make them disgorge their prey.
  - Mantling – spreading wings and body around prey to protect from piracy, especially seen in birds of prey.
- Tool use – use of an instrument to help obtain food. Seen in some corvid species and woodpecker finches.
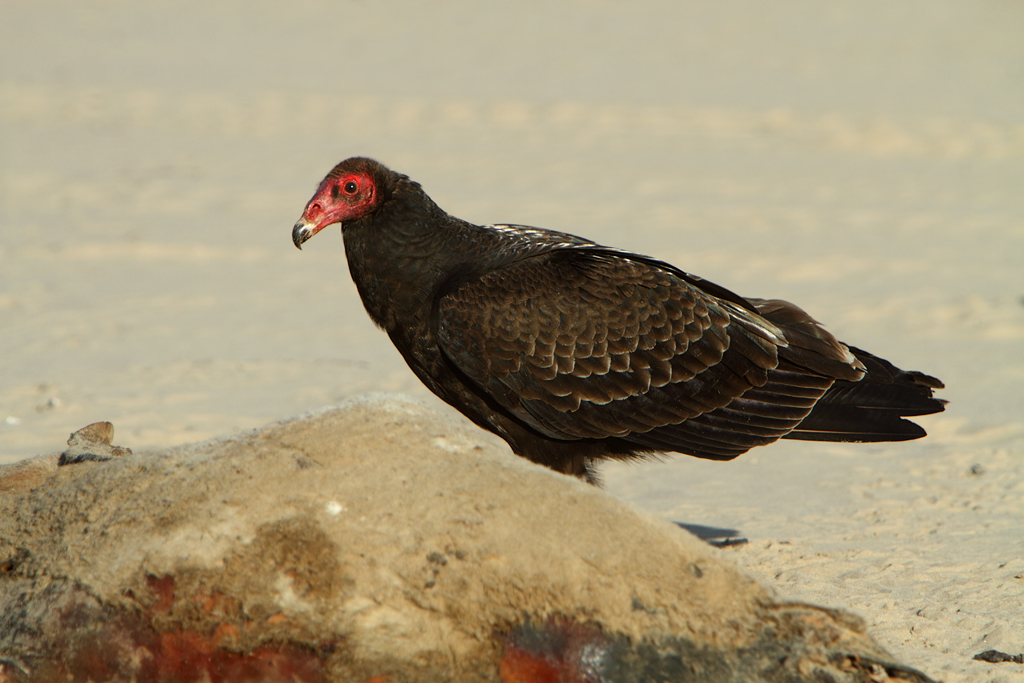
- Turkey vulture (Cathartes aura) scavenges a carcass
  Scavenging – feeding on refuse or carrion
- Chasing – pursuing prey on the ground
- Hawking – aerial pursuit of prey, which may be captured in the air or on the ground.
  - Fly-catching or aerial sallying refers to obtaining aerial food, typically flying insects. The more specific term flycatching is used to describe birds that fly out of a perch to capture an insect, and then return to a perch before handling the prey.
  - Flushing – prey is startled from hiding place, upon which bird gives pursuit
