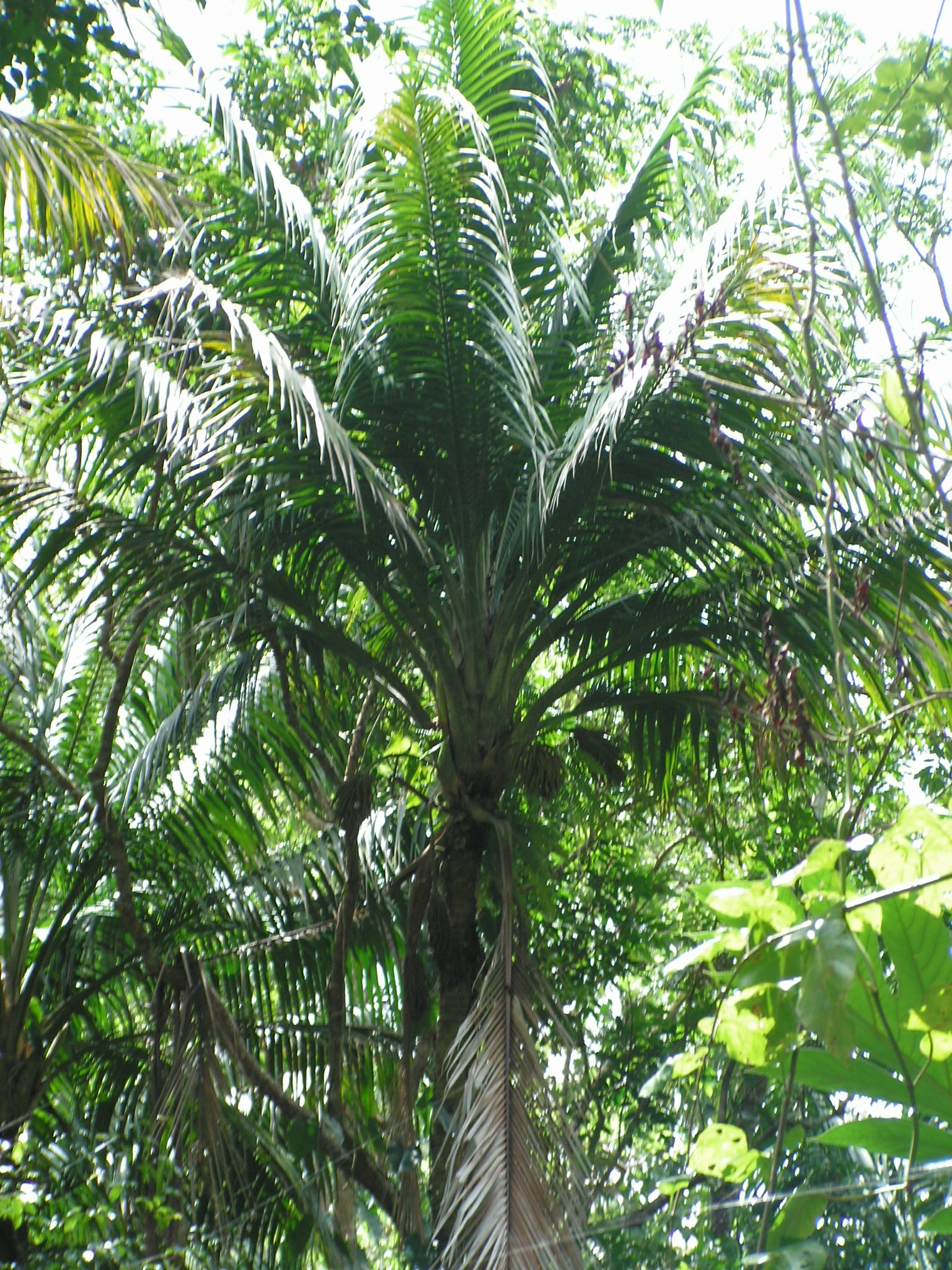
- In Quebradillas, Puerto Rico

Conservation status
- Least Concern (IUCN 3.1)

- Threatened (ESA)

Scientific classification
- Kingdom: Plantae
- Clade: Tracheophytes
- Clade: Angiosperms
- Clade: Monocots
- Clade: Commelinids
- Order: Arecales
- Family: Arecaceae
- Genus: Calyptronoma
- Species: C. rivalis

Binomial name
- Calyptronoma rivalis (O.F.Cook) L.H.Bailey

Synonyms
- Cocops rivalis O.F.Cook; Calyptrogyne rivalis (O.F.Cook) León; Calyptronoma quisqueyana L.H.Bailey; Calyptrogyne quisqueyana (L.H.Bailey) León

= Calyptronoma rivalis =

Species of palm

Calyptronoma rivalis is a pinnately compound leaved palm species that is native to the Caribbean islands of Hispaniola (in both Haiti and the Dominican Republic) and Puerto Rico. Its common names include palma de manaca and Puerto Rican manac.

== Taxonomy ==
In 1995, botanists revised the taxonomy of the genus Calyptronoma, placing Calyptronoma quisqueyana in synonymy with the rare palm. Then the species included all of the individuals previously named C. quisqueyana, extending its distribution to the island of Hispaniola, where it is common.

== Description ==
C. rivalis stems grow singly, and reach heights of 4–15 m, with stems 15–30 cm in diameter. It grows in waterlogged areas near the banks of streams; on Hispaniola, it occurs at less than 450 m above sea level, and Calyptronoma plumeriana replaces it above that elevation.

== Conservation ==
This palm was added to the Endangered Species list of the United States in 1990, with a threatened status. At that time it was believed to be endemic to Puerto Rico and limited to 3 populations with an estimated 220 total individuals remaining. Furthermore, its numbers on Puerto Rico increased to over 500, and then it was reintroduced to a few new areas on the island. The United States Fish and Wildlife Service has not removed the palm from the Endangered Species list, because Puerto Rican individuals are on private land, are not protected, and in some cases, are not reproducing successfully. The plants are located on land that is threatened with habitat destruction from development and habitat degradation resulting from poor management. The palm is more plentiful on Hispaniola, but its status there was not well known at the time. However, a 2022 evaluation of the species by the IUCN Red List considered the species as "Least Concern".
