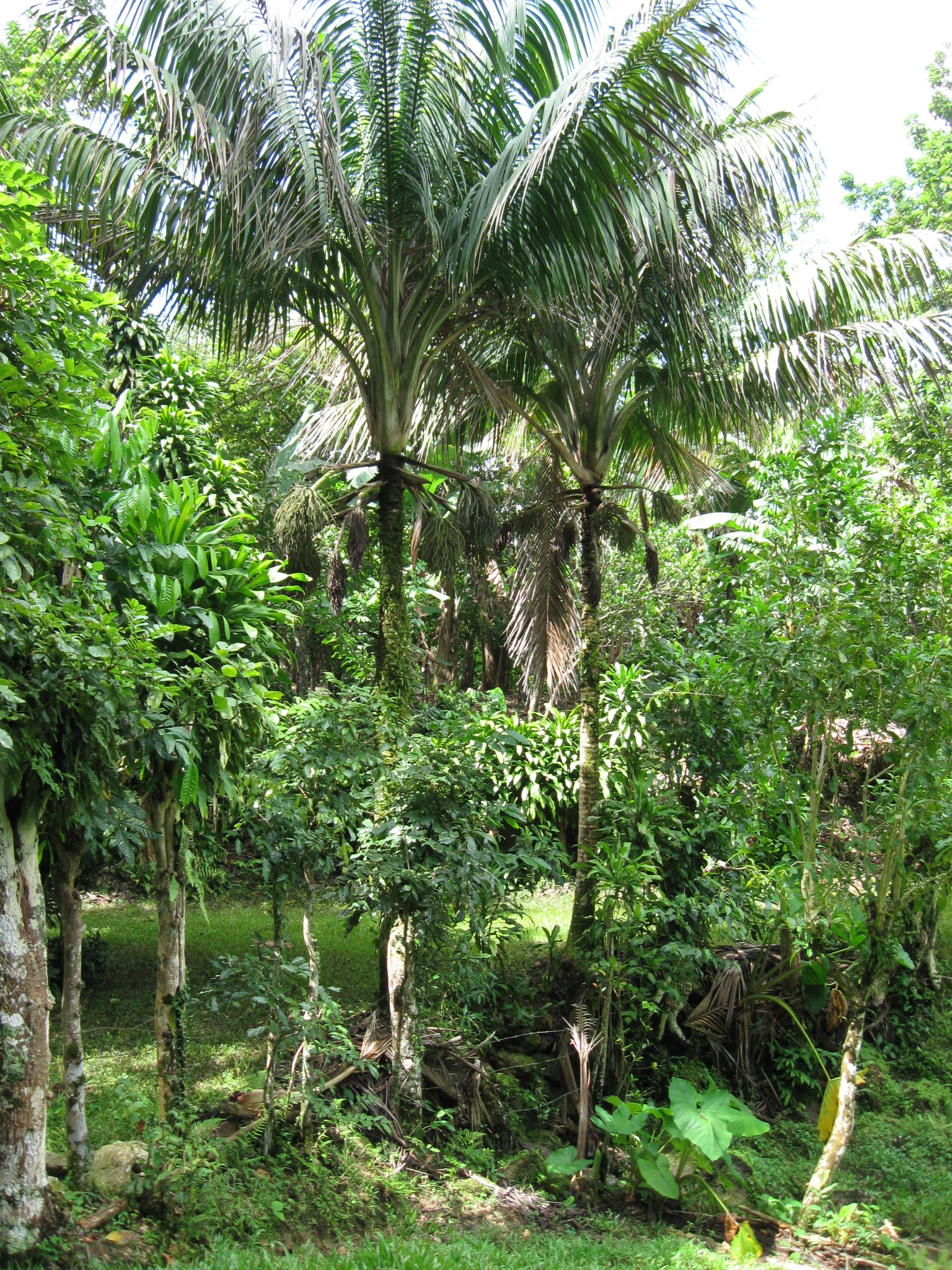
- Calyptronoma rivalis

Scientific classification
- Kingdom: Plantae
- Clade: Tracheophytes
- Clade: Angiosperms
- Clade: Monocots
- Clade: Commelinids
- Order: Arecales
- Family: Arecaceae
- Subfamily: Arecoideae
- Tribe: Geonomateae
- Genus: Calyptronoma; Griseb.

Species
- Calyptronoma occidentalis Calyptronoma plumeriana Calyptronoma rivalis

Synonyms
- Cocops O.F.Cook

= Calyptronoma =

Genus of palms

Calyptronoma is a genus in the palm family, native to the Greater Antilles. They have pinnately compound leaves with short petioles. The name was coined by August Grisebach who first described the genus in his 1846 Flora of the British West Indian Islands.

There are three species in the genus.

- Calyptronoma occidentalis — endemic to Jamaica
- Calyptronoma plumeriana — Cuba and Hispaniola
- Calyptronoma rivalis — Hispaniola and Puerto Rico
