= Communal roosting =

Animal behavior

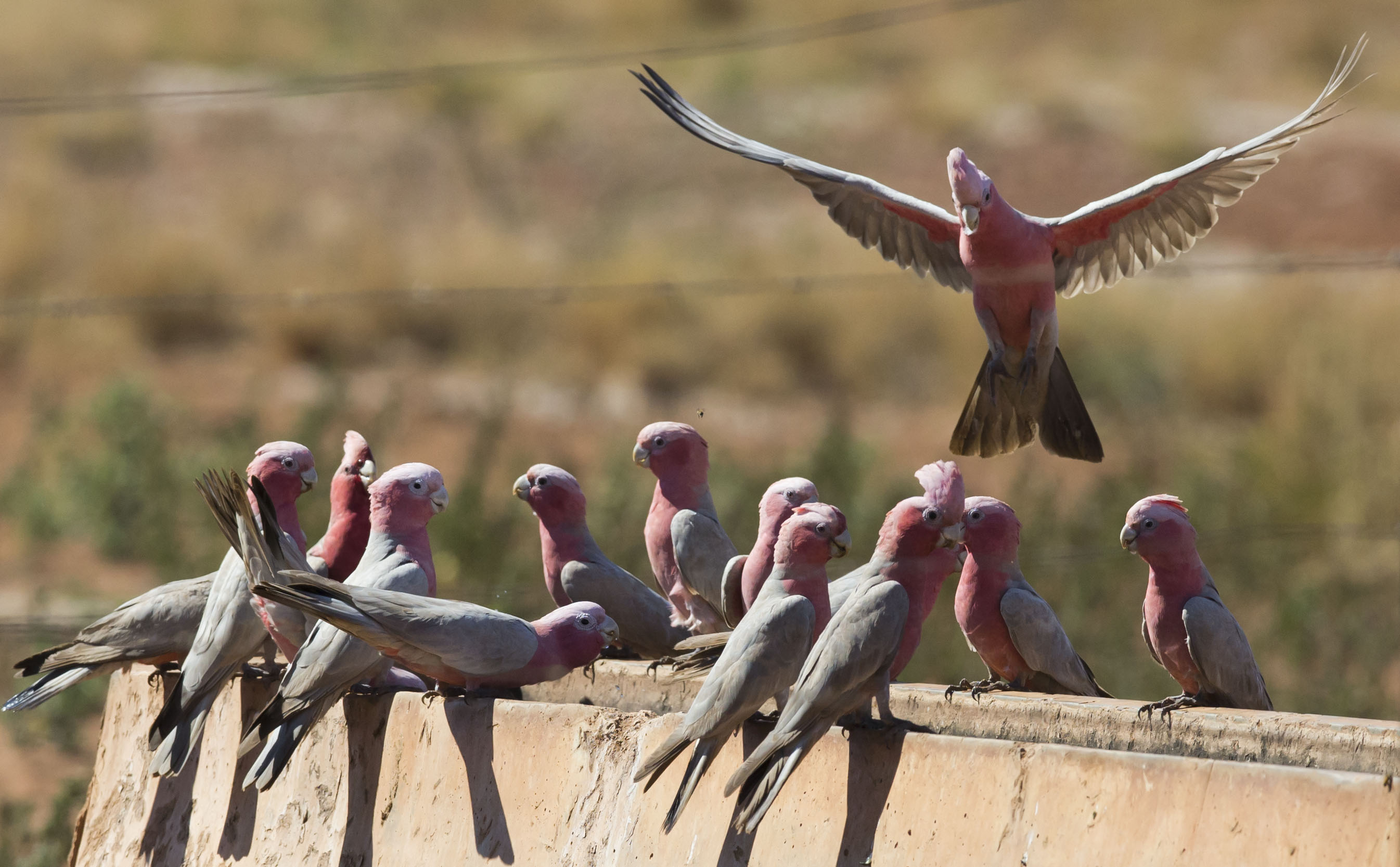
Galahs gathering for communal roost, Karratha (Australia)

Communal roosting is an animal behavior where a group of individuals, typically of the same species, congregate in an area for a few hours based on an external signal and will return to the same site with the reappearance of the signal. Environmental signals are often responsible for this grouping, including nightfall, high tide, or rainfall. The distinction between communal roosting and cooperative breeding is the absence of chicks in communal roosts. While communal roosting is generally observed in birds, the behavior has also been seen in bats, primates, and insects. The size of these roosts can measure in the thousands to millions of individuals, especially among avian species.

There are many benefits associated with communal roosting including: increased foraging ability, decreased thermoregulatory demands, decreased predation, and increased conspecific interactions. While there are many proposed evolutionary concepts for how communal roosting evolved, no specific hypothesis is currently supported by the scientific community as a whole.

== Evolution ==
One of the adaptive explanations for communal roosting is the hypothesis that individuals are benefited by the exchange of information at communal roosts. This idea is known as the information center hypothesis (ICH) and proposed by Peter Ward and Amotz Zahavi in 1973. It states that bird assemblages such as communal roosts act as information hubs for distributing knowledge about food source location. When food patch knowledge is unevenly distributed amongst certain flock members, the other "clueless" flock members can follow and join these knowledgeable members to find good feeding locations. To quote Ward and Zahavi on the evolutionary reasons as to how communal roosts came about, "...communal roosts, breeding colonies and certain other bird assemblages have been evolved primarily for the efficient exploitation of unevenly-distributed food sources by serving as ' information-centres.' "

=== The two strategies hypothesis ===
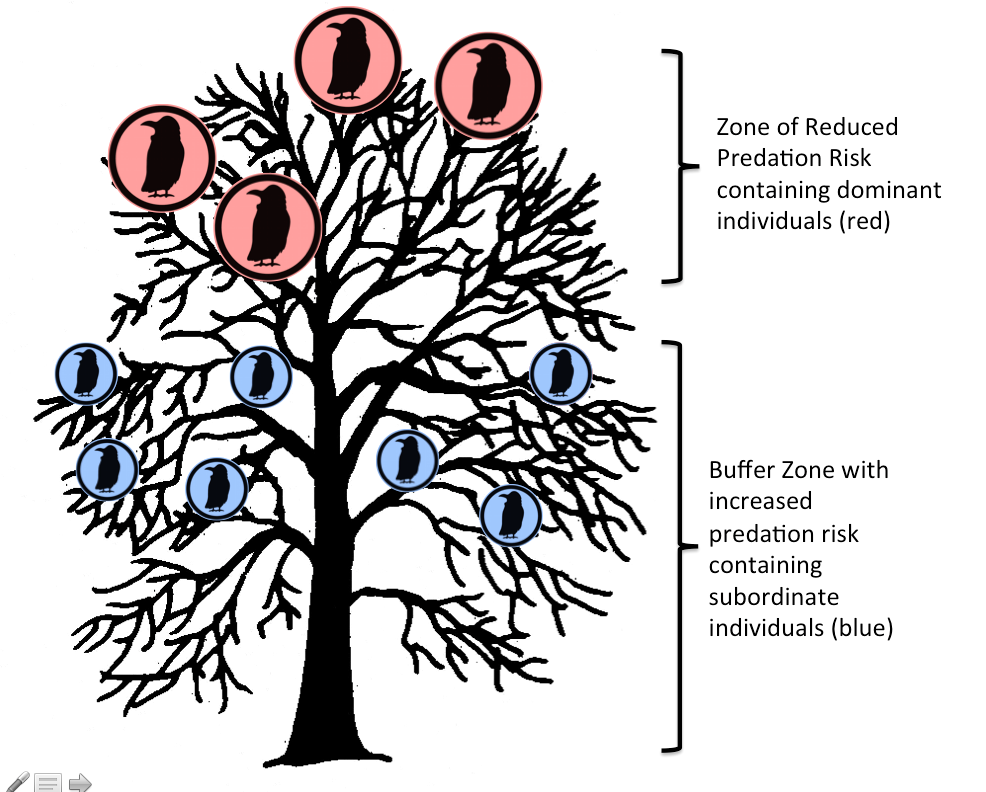
A stylized example of a communal roost under the two strategies hypothesis, with the more dominant individuals occupying the higher and safer roosts.

The two strategies hypothesis was put forth by Patrick Weatherhead in 1983 as an alternative to the then popular information center hypothesis. This hypothesis proposes that different individuals join and participate in communal roosts for different reasons that are based primarily on their social status. Unlike the ICH, not all individuals will join a roost in order to increase their foraging capabilities. This hypothesis explains that while roosts initially evolved due to information sharing among older and more experienced foragers, this evolution was aided by the benefits that more experienced foragers gained because as better foragers they acquired a status of high rank within the roost. As dominant individuals, they are able to obtain the safest roosts, typically those highest in the tree or closest to the center of the roost. In these roosts, the less dominant and unsuccessful foragers act as a physical predation buffer for the dominant individuals. This is similar to the selfish herd theory, which states that individuals within herds will utilize conspecifics as physical barriers from predation. The younger and less dominant individuals will still join the roost because they gain some safety from predation through the dilution effect, as well as the ability to learn from the more experienced foragers that are already in the roost.

Support for the two strategies hypothesis has been shown in studies of roosting rooks (Corvus frugilegus). A 1977 study of roosting rooks by Ian Swingland showed that an inherent hierarchy exists within rook communal roosts. In this hierarchy, the most dominant individuals have been shown to routinely occupy the roosts highest in the tree, and while they pay a cost (increased energy use to keep warm) they are safer from terrestrial predators. Despite this enforced hierarchy, lower ranking rooks remained with the roost, indicating that they still received some benefit from their participation in the roost. When weather conditions worsened, the more dominant rooks forced the younger and less dominant out of their roosts. Swingland proposed that the risk of predation at lower roosts was outweighed by the gains in reduced thermal demands. Similar support for the two strategies hypothesis has also been found in red-winged blackbird (Agelaius phoeniceus) roosts. In this species the more dominant males will regularly inhabit roosts in thicker brush, where they are better hidden from predators than the less dominant individuals, that are forced to roost at the edge of the brush.

The TSH makes several assumptions that must be met in order for the theory to work. The first major assumption is that within communal roosts there are certain roosts that possess safer or more beneficial qualities than other roosts. The second assumption is that the more dominant individuals will be capable of securing these roosts, and finally dominance rank must be a reliable indicator of foraging ability.

=== The recruitment center hypothesis (RCH) ===
Proposed by Heinz Richner and Philipp Heeb in 1996, the recruitment center hypothesis (RCH) explains the evolution of communal roosting as a result of group foraging. The RCH also explains behaviors seen at communal roosts such as: the passing of information, aerial displays, and the presence or lack of calls by leaders. This hypothesis assumes:

- Patchy feeding area: Food is not evenly distributed across an area but grouped into patches
- Short-lasting: Patches are not present for an extended period of time
- Relatively abundant: There are many patches with relatively equal amounts of food present in each

These factors decrease relative food competition since control over a food source by an individual is not correlated to the duration or richness of said source. The passing of information acts to create a foraging group. Group foraging decreases predation and increases relative feeding time at the cost of sharing a food source. The decrease in predation is due to the dilution factor and an early warning system created by having multiple animals alert. Increases in relative feeding are explained by decreasing time spent watching for predators and social learning. Recruiting new members to food patches benefits successful foragers by increasing relative numbers. With the addition of new members to a group the benefits of group foraging increase until the group size is larger than the food source is able to support. Less successful foragers benefit by gaining knowledge of where food sources are located. Aerial displays are used to recruit individuals to participate in group foraging. However, not all birds display since not all birds are members in a group or are part of a group that is seeking participants. In the presence of patchy resources, Richner and Heeb propose the simplest manner would be to form a communal roost and recruit participants there. In other words, recruitment to foraging groups explains the presence of these communal roosts.

Support for the RCH has been shown in ravens (Covus corax). Reviewing a previous study by John Marzluff, Bernd Heinrich, and Colleen Marzluff, Etienne Danchin and Heinz Richner demonstrate that the collected data proves the RCH instead of the ICH supported by Marzluff, et al. Both knowledgeable and naïve ("clueless") birds are shown to make up the roosts and leave them at the same time, with the naïve birds being led to the food sources. Aerial demonstrations were shown to peak around the same time as the discovery of a new food source. These communities were made up of non-breeders which forage in patchily distributed food environments, following the assumptions made by Richner and Heeb. In 2014, Sarangi et al. shown that the recruitment centre hypothesis did not hold in the study population of Common Mynas (Acridotheres tristis) and hence Common Myna roosts are not recruitment centres.

At this point in time there has been no additional scientific evidence excluding RCH or any evidence of overwhelming support. What is overlooked by RCH is that information may also be passed within the communal roost which increases and solidifies the community.

== Potential benefits ==
Birds in a communal roost can reduce the impact of wind and cold weather by sharing body heat through huddling, which reduces the overall energy demand of thermoregulation. A study by Guy Beauchamp explained that black-billed magpies (Pica hudsonia) often formed the largest roosts during the winter. The magpies tend to react very slowly at low body temperatures, leaving them vulnerable to predators. Communal roosting in this case would improve their reactivity by sharing body heat, allowing them to detect and respond to predators much more quickly.

A large roost with many members can visually detect predators easier, allowing individuals to respond and alert others quicker to threats. Individual risk is also lowered due to the dilution effect, which states that an individual in a large group will have a low probability of being preyed upon. Similar to the selfish herd theory, communal roosts have demonstrated a hierarchy of sorts where older members and better foragers nest in the interior of the group, decreasing their exposure to predators. Younger birds and less able foragers located on the outskirts still demonstrate some safety from predation due to the dilution effect.

According to the ICH, successful foragers share knowledge of favorable foraging sites with unsuccessful foragers at a communal roost, making it energetically advantageous for individuals to communally roost and forage more easily. Additionally with a greater number of individuals at a roost, the searching range of a roost will increase and improve the probability of finding favorable foraging sites.

There are also potentially improved mating opportunities, as demonstrated by red-billed choughs (Pyrrhocorax pyrrhocorax), which have a portion of a communal roost dedicated to individuals that lack mates and territories.

== Potential costs ==
It is costly for territorial species to physically travel to and from roosts, and in leaving their territories they open themselves up to takeovers. Communal roosts may draw the attention of potential predators, as the roost becomes audibly and visibly more conspicuous due to the number of members. There is also a decrease in the local food supply as a greater number of members results in competition for food. A large number of roost members can also increases the exposure to droppings, causing plumage to deteriorate and leaving birds vulnerable to dying from exposure as droppings reduce the ability of feathers to shed water.

== Examples by species ==
=== Birds ===
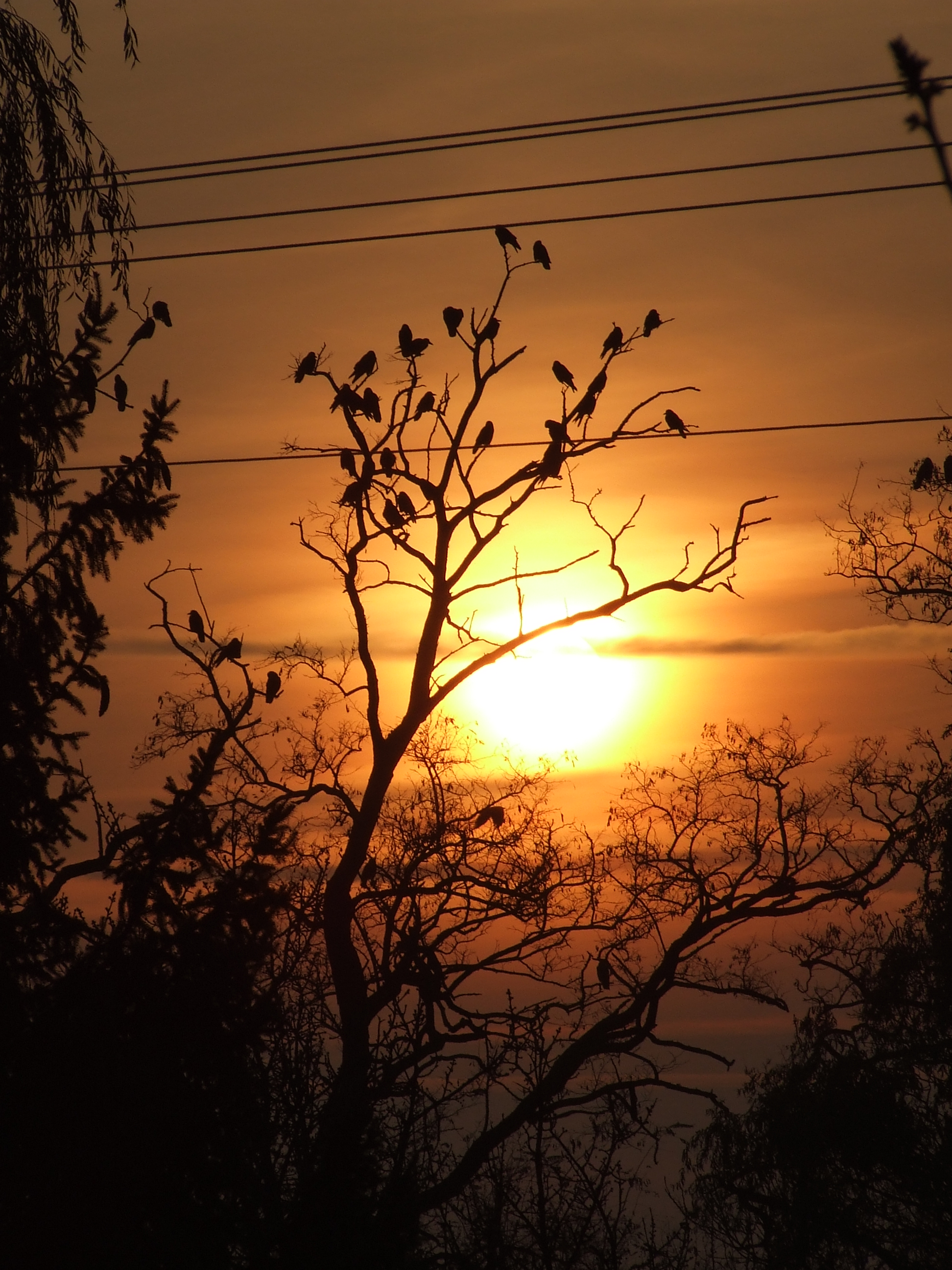
Rooks forming a nocturnal roost in Hungary

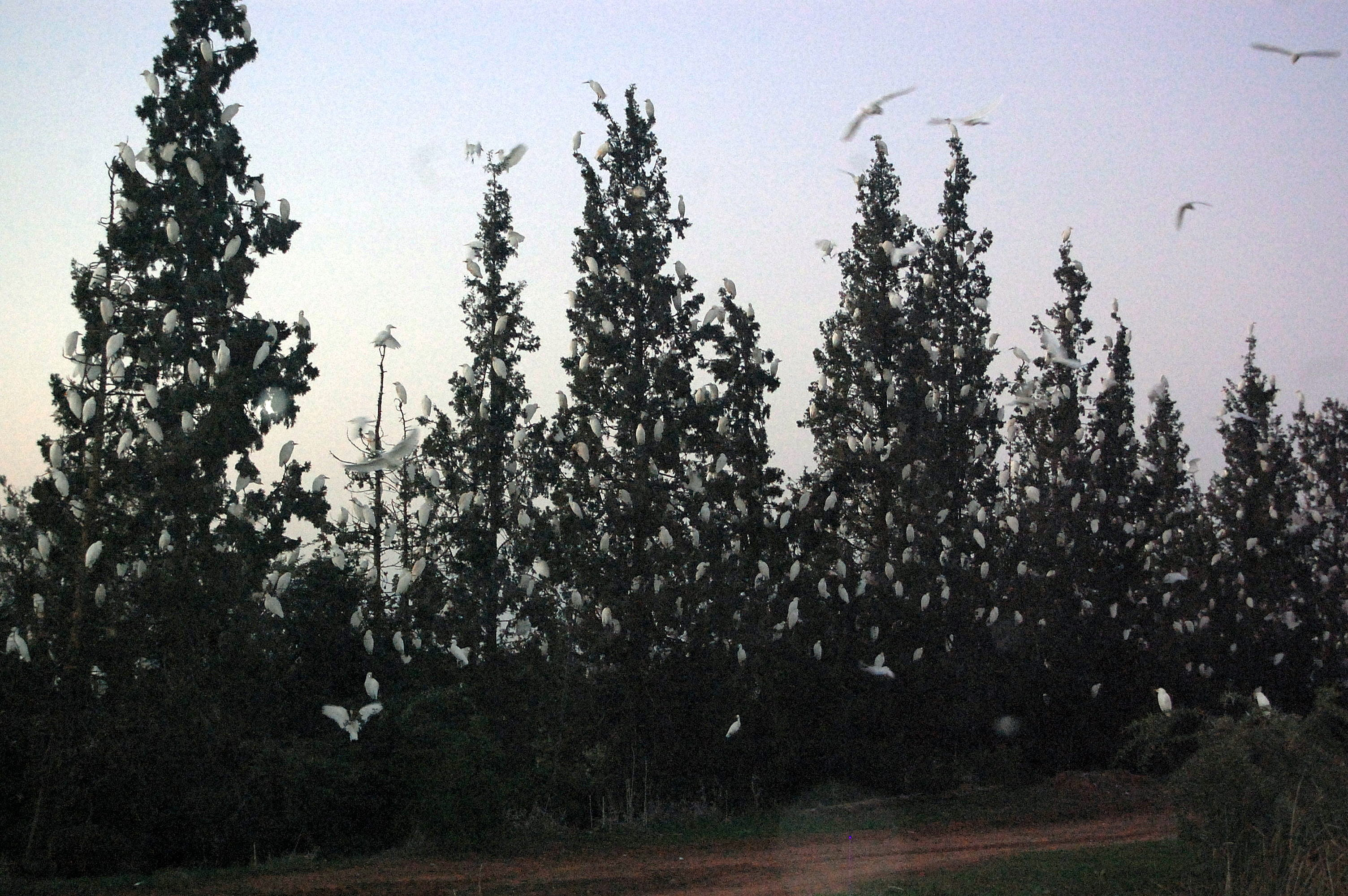
Western Cattle Egret night roosting in Morocco

Communal roosting has been observed in numerous avian species. As previously mentioned, rooks (Corvus frugilegus) are known to form large nocturnal roosts, these roosts can contain anywhere from a few hundred to over a thousand individuals. These roosts then disband at daybreak when the birds return to foraging activities. Studies have shown that communal roosting behavior is mediated by light intensity, which is correlated with sunset, where rooks will return to the roost when the ambient light has sufficiently dimmed.

Acorn woodpeckers (Melanerpes formicivorus) are known to form communal roosts during the winter months. In these roosts two to three individuals will share a cavity during the winter. Within these tree cavities woodpeckers share their body heat with each other and therefore decrease the thermoregulatory demands on the individuals within the roost. Small scale communal roosting during the winter months has also been observed in Green Woodhoopoes (Phoeniculus purpureus). Winter communal roosts in these species typically contain around five individuals.

Tree swallows (Tachycineta bicolor) located in southeastern Louisiana are known to form nocturnal communal roosts and have been shown to exhibit high roost fidelity, with individuals often returning to the same roost they had occupied on the previous night. Research has shown that swallows form communal roosts due to the combined factors of conspecific attraction, where individual swallows are likely to aggregate around other swallows of the same species, and roost fidelity. Tree swallows will form roosts numbering in hundreds or thousands of individuals.

Eurasian crag martins (Ptyonoprogne rupestris) also form large nocturnal communal roosts during the winter months. Up to 12,000 individuals have been found roosting communally at the Gorham's Cave Complex in Gibraltar. As with the tree swallows, research has shown that Eurasian crag martins also exhibit a high degree of fidelity to the roost, with individuals returning to the same caves within and between years.

Red-billed choughs (Pyrrhocorax pyrrhocorax) roost in what has been classified as either a main roost or a sub roost. Main roosts are constantly in use, whereas the sub roosts are used irregularly by individuals lacking both a mate and territory. These sub roosts are believed to help improve the ability of non-breeding choughs to find a mate and increase their territory ranges.

Interspecies roosts have been observed between different bird species. In San Blas, Mexico, the great egret (Ardea alba), little blue heron (Egretta caerulea), tricolored heron (Egretta tricolor), and snowy egrets (Egretta thula) are known to form large communal roosts. It has been shown that the snowy egret determines the general location of the roost because the other three species rely on it for its abilities to find food sources. In these roosts there is often a hierarchical system, where the more dominant species (in this case the snowy egret) will typically occupy the more desirable higher perches. Interspecies roosts have also been observed among other avian species.

=== Insects ===
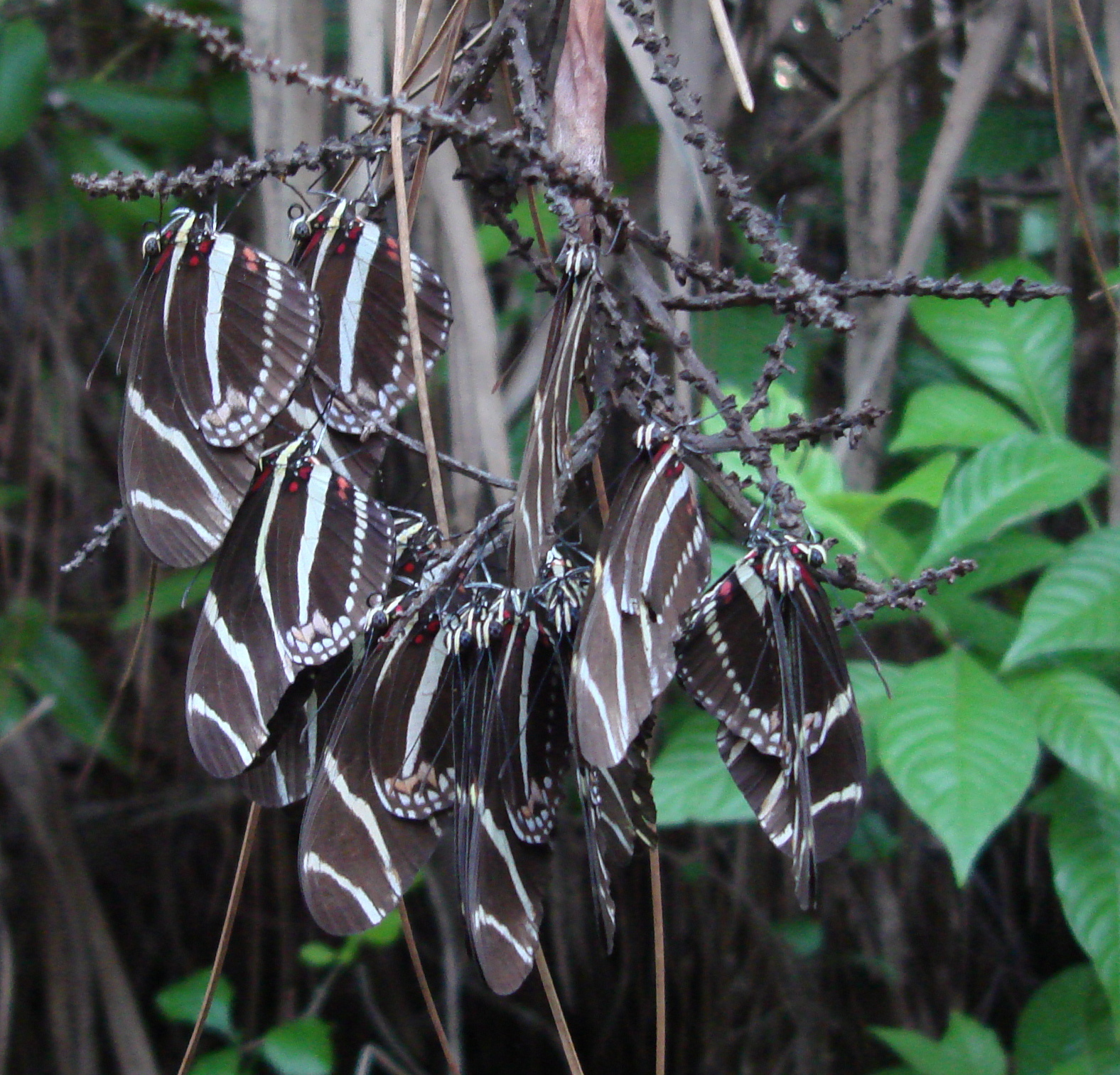
Zebra Longwing butterflies (Heliconius charitonius) sleeping in a nocturnal communal roost.

Communal roosting has also been well documented among insects, particularly butterflies. The passion-vine butterfly (Heliconius erato) is known to form nocturnal roosts, typically comprising four individuals. It is believed that these roosts deter potential predators because predators attack roosts less often than they do individuals.

Communal roosting behavior has also been observed in the neotropical zebra longwing butterfly (Heliconius charitonius) in the La Cinchona region of Costa Rica. A study of this roost showed that individuals vary in their roost fidelity, and that they tend to form smaller sub roosts. The same study observed that in this region communal roosting can be mediated by heavy rainfall.

Communal roosting has also been observed in south Peruvian tiger beetles of the subfamily Cicindelidae. These species of tiger beetle have been observed to form communal roosts comprising anywhere from two to nine individuals at night and disbanding during the day. It is hypothesized that these beetles roost high in the treetops in order to avoid ground-based predators.

=== Mammals ===
While there are few observations of communal roosting mammals, the trait has been seen in several species of bats. The little brown bat (Myotis lucifugus) is known to participate in communal roosts of up to thirty seven during cold nights in order to decrease thermoregulatory demands, with the roost disbanding at daybreak.

Several other species of bats, including the hoary bat (Lasiurus cinereus) and the big brown bat (Eptesicus fuscus) have also been observed to roost communally in maternal colonies in order to reduce the thermoregulatory demands on both the lactating mothers and juveniles.

== See also ==
- Communal breeding
- Cooperative breeding
- Ecology
- Ecosystem
- Evolutionary models of food sharing
- Habitat conservation
- Habitat fragmentation
- Habitat
- Heliconius charithonia
- Mating system
- Reproduction
