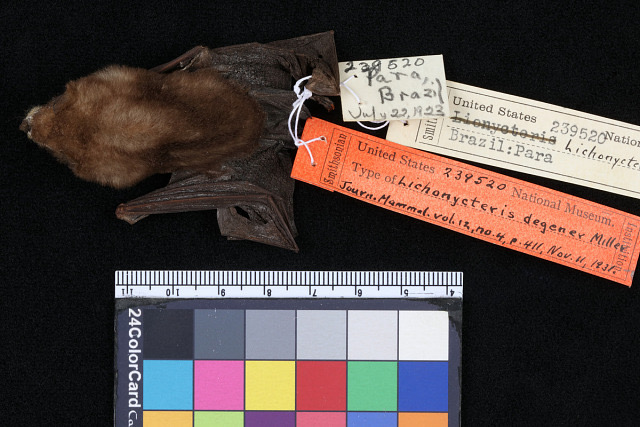
- Lichonycteris degener

Conservation status
- Least Concern (IUCN 3.1)

Scientific classification
- Kingdom: Animalia
- Phylum: Chordata
- Class: Mammalia
- Infraclass: Placentalia
- Order: Chiroptera
- Family: Phyllostomidae
- Genus: Lichonycteris
- Species: L. degener

Binomial name
- Lichonycteris degener Miller, 1931

= Pale brown long-nosed bat =

Species of bat

The pale brown long-nosed bat (Lichonycteris degener) is a species of leaf-nosed bat in the family Phyllostomidae. It is found across South America. It is apparently gregarious and lives in social groups.

== Taxonomy ==
The species was formerly thought to be in dark long-tongued bat (L. obscura), but is now recognized as a separate species.

== Distribution and habitat ==
The species is found in the Andes from Colombia, Venezuela, Guyana, Suriname, French Guiana, Ecuador, Peru, Bolivia, and Brazil. It lives at an elevation of 50-900 m. Most specimens are observed in dense forests. However, it is rare locally, though that may be because of a lack of knowledge on its ecological requirements.

== Biology ==
=== Diet ===
The bat mostly eats nectar and insects.

== Conservation ==
The species has been rated as Least Concern on the latest IUCN Red List assessment for it in July 2016. However, the threats to the species are not well known due to lack of knowledge about its ecology. It may occur in some protected areas throughout its Amazon range.
