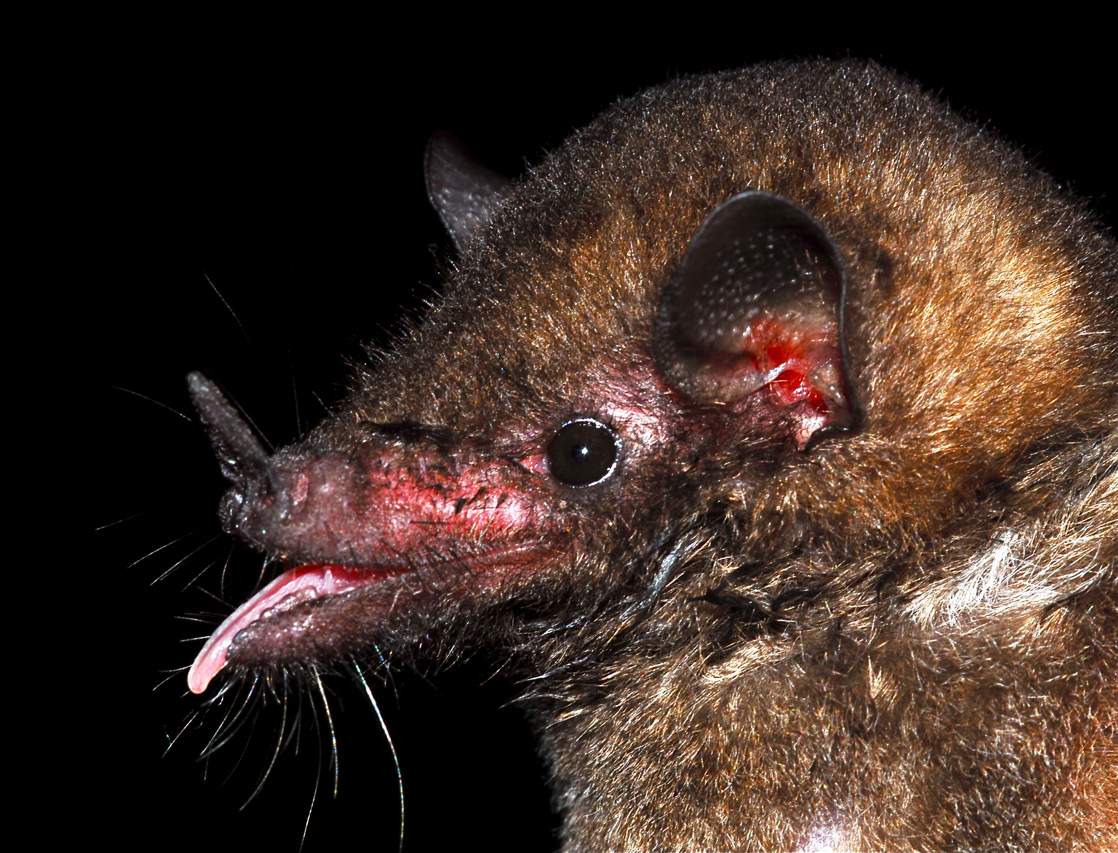
- Bat in the genus Lichonycteris in Brazil

Scientific classification
- Kingdom: Animalia
- Phylum: Chordata
- Class: Mammalia
- Order: Chiroptera
- Family: Phyllostomidae
- Subfamily: Glossophaginae
- Genus: Lichonycteris; Thomas, 1895

Species
- See text

= Lichonycteris =

Genus of bats

Lichonycteris (Little long-tongued bat) is a genus of bats in the family Phyllostomidae. Its members are native to South America.

== Species ==
- L. degener (Miller, 1931): Pale brown long-nosed bat
- L. obscura (Thomas, 1895): Dark long-tongued bat
