= Calyptronoma occidentalis =

Scientific classification
- Kingdom: Plantae
- Clade: Tracheophytes
- Clade: Angiosperms
- Clade: Monocots
- Clade: Commelinids
- Order: Arecales
- Family: Arecaceae
- Genus: Calyptronoma
- Species: C. occidentalis

Binomial name
- Calyptronoma occidentalis (Sw.) H.E.Moore

Synonyms
- Elaeis occidentalis Sw.; Calyptronoma swartzii Griseb., nom. illeg.; Geonoma swartzii Griseb., nom. illeg.; Calyptrogyne swartzii Hook.f.; Calyptrogyne occidentalis (Sw.) M.Gómez; Calyptrogyne victorinii León

Species of palm

Calyptronoma occidentalis is a species of palm which is native to Cuba and Jamaica. C. occidentalis is pinnately compound leaved, with stems that grow singly and reach heights of 7–12 m and 17–20 cm in diameter. It grows in waterlogged areas near the banks of streams, up to an elevation of 800 m above sea level.

The species was first described by Swedish botanist Olof Swartz in 1797 in his Flora Indiae Occidentalis.
