= Avishag Zahavi =

Israeli biologist (1922–2021)

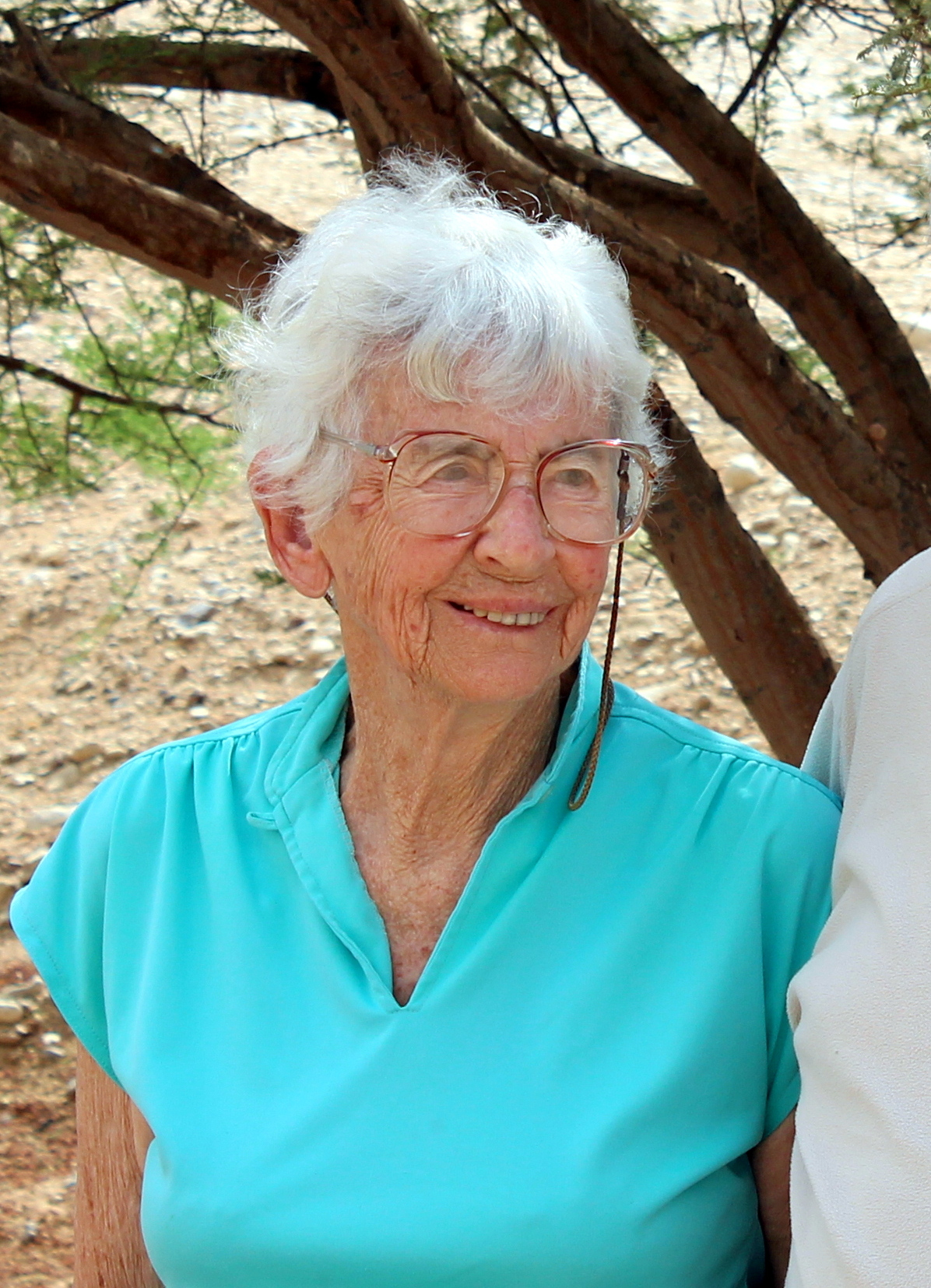
Zahavi in 2012

Avishag Kadman-Zahavi (Hebrew: אבישג זהבי; 1922 − 31 October 2021) was an Israeli professor emeritus of Plant Physiology at The Volcani Center for Agricultural Research, Beit Dagan, Israel. She is best known for her close collaboration with her husband Amotz Zahavi, who developed together with her the so-called Handicap principle, a sociobiological approach to the theory of natural selection.

She was born in Haifa in 1922. A lifelong naturalist, Avishag Kadman met Amotz Zahavi at the Hebrew University of Jerusalem during their studies in the field of biology and married him in 1954. Since then, besides following her own field of research, she has collaborated with Amotz in the study of the babblers and in the development of his ideas, often serving as the "devil's advocate". Her research interests are basic and applied aspects of the effects of light on plant development (photoperiodism, phytochrome, photomorphogenesis).

After her retirement, Kadman-Zahavi continued her research at the Yair center for agricultural research at Hatzeva. She died on 31 October 2021. Avishag and Amotz Zahavi had two daughters and two grandchildren.

== Sources ==
- The biographical details were learned from the German edition of: Amotz Zahavi & Avishag Zahavi: The Handicap Principle: A Missing Piece of Darwin's Puzzle. Oxford University Press, 1997, ISBN 978-0-19-510035-8; additional source: Naama Zahavi-Ely, College of William and Mary, Williamsburg, VA, USA
