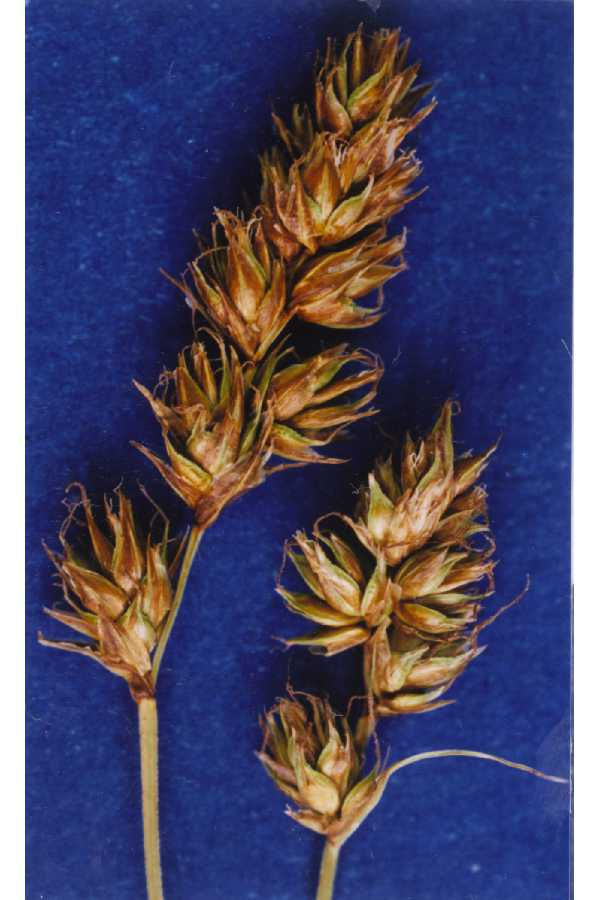

Conservation status
- Apparently Secure (NatureServe)

Scientific classification
- Kingdom: Plantae
- Clade: Tracheophytes
- Clade: Angiosperms
- Clade: Monocots
- Clade: Commelinids
- Order: Poales
- Family: Cyperaceae
- Genus: Carex
- Species: C. occidentalis

Binomial name
- Carex occidentalis L.H.Bailey

Synonyms
- Carex neomexicana

= Carex occidentalis =

Species of grass-like plant

Carex occidentalis is a species of sedge known by the common name western sedge. It is native to the southwestern United States and parts of the west as far north as Montana. It grows mainly in dry habitat such as woodland and grassland. The plant produces very narrow stems up to about 90 centimeters in maximum height, sometimes with rhizomes. The inflorescence produces a cluster of several rounded flower spikes. The pistillate flowers are covered in scales which are brown with green, three-veined centers.
