= Information centre hypothesis =

Ethological theory about birds

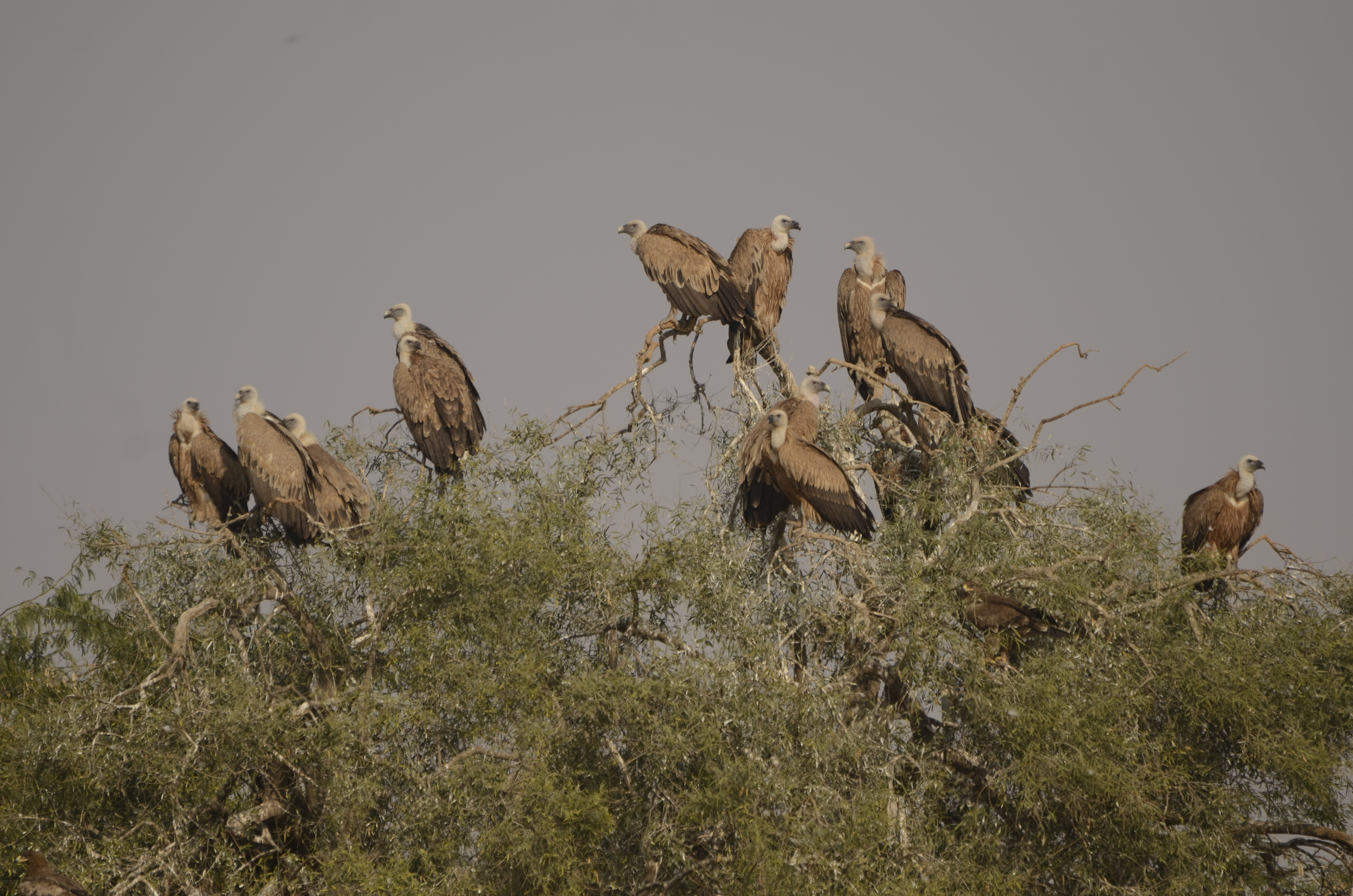
Griffon vultures in a communal roost

The information centre hypothesis (ICH) is a theory that states bird species live in communal roosts primarily for the advantage of gaining information from others in the community regarding the location of unevenly distributed food resources. This hypothesis was first proposed by Peter Ward and Israeli biologist Amotz Zahavi (1973). They stated that birds join assemblages in order to gain information about food resources and increase foraging efficiency. Using this strategy would allow unsuccessful birds to return to the population and gain information, often by observing behavioural differences in successful birds. Following the exchange of knowledge, the unsuccessful individuals then follow those deemed successful back to the resource location.

The hypothesis has been studied and experimentally supported in many different types of communally roosting birds, notably crows and vultures. This strategy is regarded as evolutionarily adaptive, because it would prevent the unsuccessful bird from having to start the search for food over in a random method. By the early 1980s, the information centre hypothesis was widely accepted and used to explain communal roosting behaviour, however this popularity also led to substantial criticism. One criticism of the theory is the multiple assumptions required to fulfill the criteria to support the hypothesis. Another criticism of the theory is its narrow scope, as it pertains strictly to food information sharing. Additional criticism questions whether the information centre hypothesis is an evolutionarily stable strategy.

== Theory ==
The information centre hypothesis was first described by Peter Ward and Amotz Zahavi in 1973. They theorized that communal roosts evolved and were maintained as a result of the advantage obtained by unsuccessful individuals in locating food resources from information provided by successful individuals. The information centre hypothesis requires that two conditions be met; first, that successful individuals return to the communal roost after feeding, and second, birds without the knowledge of the food source must recognize these individuals as successful and then follow them back to the food source. In their primary work, Ward and Zahavi studied red-billed quelea and cattle egret birds, noting that individuals who were unsuccessful in the morning would return to the communal roost and follow other birds away from the roost in the afternoon.

Mock et al. (1988) provide seven requirements which must be fulfilled in a species for the information centre hypothesis to be supported. First, birds who are successful in foraging must return to rewarding locations. Second, while some individuals discover these rewarding locations, others remain unaware of these locations. Third, previously unsuccessful individuals must be able to recognize others as successful or unsuccessful. Fourth, unsuccessful individuals must leave the communal roost when the successful individuals leave the roost. Fifth, the previously unsuccessful individuals must follow the successful individuals to the feeding location. Sixth, previously unsuccessful individuals must be permitted to share the food source by successful individuals. Seventh, the overall net benefit of receiving information and following, must be greater than an individual searching for food on their own.

While it may seem counterproductive for a successful individual to share resource knowledge, the information centre hypothesis argues that this behaviour is adaptive. The information centre hypothesis argues this behaviour is a defensive mechanism so that in the event of a sudden resource devaluation which destroys the food source, the bird would be able to obtain new resource information from other roosting individuals. This idea has been supported in studies which show that individuals in areas with a recent heavy snowfall searched longer for a communal roost compared to individuals in non-snowy areas. This is potentially so the bird would be able to upgrade their resource knowledge with others' information.

Support for the information centre hypothesis includes the idea that individuals living in groups have more resource information available, at a lower cost than finding it themselves. In addition, multiple studies have made note that food sources for flock-living birds are typically consumed quickly by other predators, such as mammals or decomposers. Therefore, individuals likely do not suffer from sharing knowledge with conspecifics due to the short-lived nature of the resource.

Currently, there is only speculation as to how the information is conveyed. It has been suggested that the successful members first convey their knowledge through displays and the unsuccessful members then follow, or that the unsuccessful members circle in the air or slowly fly out and proceed to join the successful members when they take off. Ward and Zahavi approached the explanation for the ICH in several different ways, but each explanation is related to the ability to distribute knowledge of resources. In this case, roosting can be divided into several components: advertisement, synchronized breeding, seasonality, mood, and predation.

- Advertisement is simply defined as a behavior that attracts more members to a communal roost. This can either be through aerial displays, such as the zigzag and spiraling of cattle egrets (Bubulcus ibis), being conspicuously colored in open places like the white wagtail (Motacilla alba), chirping loudly or acting very noisily in heavily foliaged locations that would be optimal for hiding such as various starling (family Sturnidae) species, or even general behavior like flying towards the roost as a large group – a large group of waders is extremely noticeable as they form a massive cloud several kilometers long. One possible explanation for how this behavior evolved is that advertisement is an advantageous behavior due to how it improves the searching capabilities of the roost by attracting more members, which then allows for more food site information that can be shared.
- Synchronized breeding contributes to the ICH in that, as stated previously, more members contribute to a communal roost's ability to search for more food. The red billed quelea (Quelea quelea), for instance, breed synchronously, resulting in large groups of juveniles in the same age. The adult quelea leave the nest when their young are about three weeks old, meaning that the young must learn to communicate as a group, and eventually develop into a communal roost where food site information is exchanged efficiently. This is also made easier due to the large number of members in the group as a result of synchronized breeding.
- Roost sizes tend to fluctuate seasonally, with species like the starling, white wagtail, chaffinch (Fringilla coelebs), brambling (Fringilla montifringilla), and the icterids (Icteridea family) forming large groups during the winter. This increased group size is believed to increase the ability to gain and distribute food knowledge as a result of an environmental situation that creates the greatest need for the members to search and share information. Similar to advertisement and synchronized breeding and to reiterate the role of ICH, this behavior also improves food searching capabilities and information exchange and may have been an advantageous behavior that evolved.
- Ward and Zahavi stated that when members of the roost are in a "good mood," they behave in a manner that shows other flock members that they are well fed and knowledgeable about food locations. This demonstrates to other members that there are energetic advantages to staying in this roost with members with good moods. In a sense, good mood would serve as a possible method of information transfer. Evolutionarily and with consideration of the ICH, it would be advantageous to have a behavior that maintains the information centre size and keeps members in the communal roost. How mood is displayed can vary with species. Starlings, grackles and queleas for instance chatter throughout the night after assembling in their roosts and chatter again before leaving the roost at dawn. Mood, however, does not seem to be well understood at the moment.
- Ward and Zahavi also believed that the purpose of communal roosting was not for predation protection, although it seems that predation plays more of a role in the formation of the ICH. Although communal roosting has some predator defense roles such as better detection capabilities, it did not arise evolutionarily as a response to predation – in many cases, a large group of birds cannot do much against a predator. However, predators play a role in the density of assemblages, as high predation pressure can greatly space apart the roosting of species (some communal breeders can be forced to nest solitarily). Because food source knowledge is a factor of population, predation will weaken the ability to find food and spread knowledge. Thus, predation plays an evolutionary role in the distribution and formation of assemblages as information centres.

Ward and Zahavi cited a variety of species that demonstrate behaviors supporting the ICH but no species exhibited all of the behaviors. Red-winged blackbirds (Agelaius phoeniceus) exhibit synchronized breeding patterns, as well as have displays to attract birds to join the same nesting site. An observation Ward and Zahavi had done of red-billed queleas and the cattle egrets showed altered behavior after individually failing to find food in the morning and later in the afternoon. However, after resting in a secondary roost, these birds that failed joined other birds and flew off in a completely different direction. White wagtails and cattle egrets are two species proposed to demonstrate advertisement, with their coloring and pattern making them very noticeable and the two species often choosing open places for assemblages. There is also a large variety of finch species that have large, long-term roosting sites as well as large food searching areas.

=== Critiques of ICH ===
On an individual basis, there are not many benefits for aiding other unsuccessful and naïve or "clueless" members. For example, it is energetically costly for a successful forager to fly back to the roost and back again to the food source with more foragers. There may even be a risk of disease or parasitism with the clueless foragers accompanying the successful forager. It may be that the successful forager expects reciprocal altruism—where the unsuccessful members could provide food knowledge to the successful forager in the future—but given the size and mobility of roosts, this is unlikely to be the case.

There are some questions about the applications of ICH before and after roost members fly out to search for food. It is possible that members that leave the roost at the same time will search for food independently afterwards. In fact, large group movement may be completely unrelated to food, and may be for protection from predators when flying to another location. Prior to flying out, it is difficult to determine how the transfer of information occurs. It may be that rather than at the roost, the transfer occurs locally at the food site. For instance, an individual may notice the large movement of members towards a specific location from afar.

The ICH may also not apply to all species, as there are variations in hunting and scavenging behaviors. For instance, some piscivorous herons rely on stealth, which is the opposite of group feeding and movement. Several heron species are also highly territorial and do not allow for conspecific feeding. Some studies of gulls also show that colony members did not follow the knowledgeable gulls. In these cases, gull foraging behavior might be better explained by local transfer of information.

== Examples ==
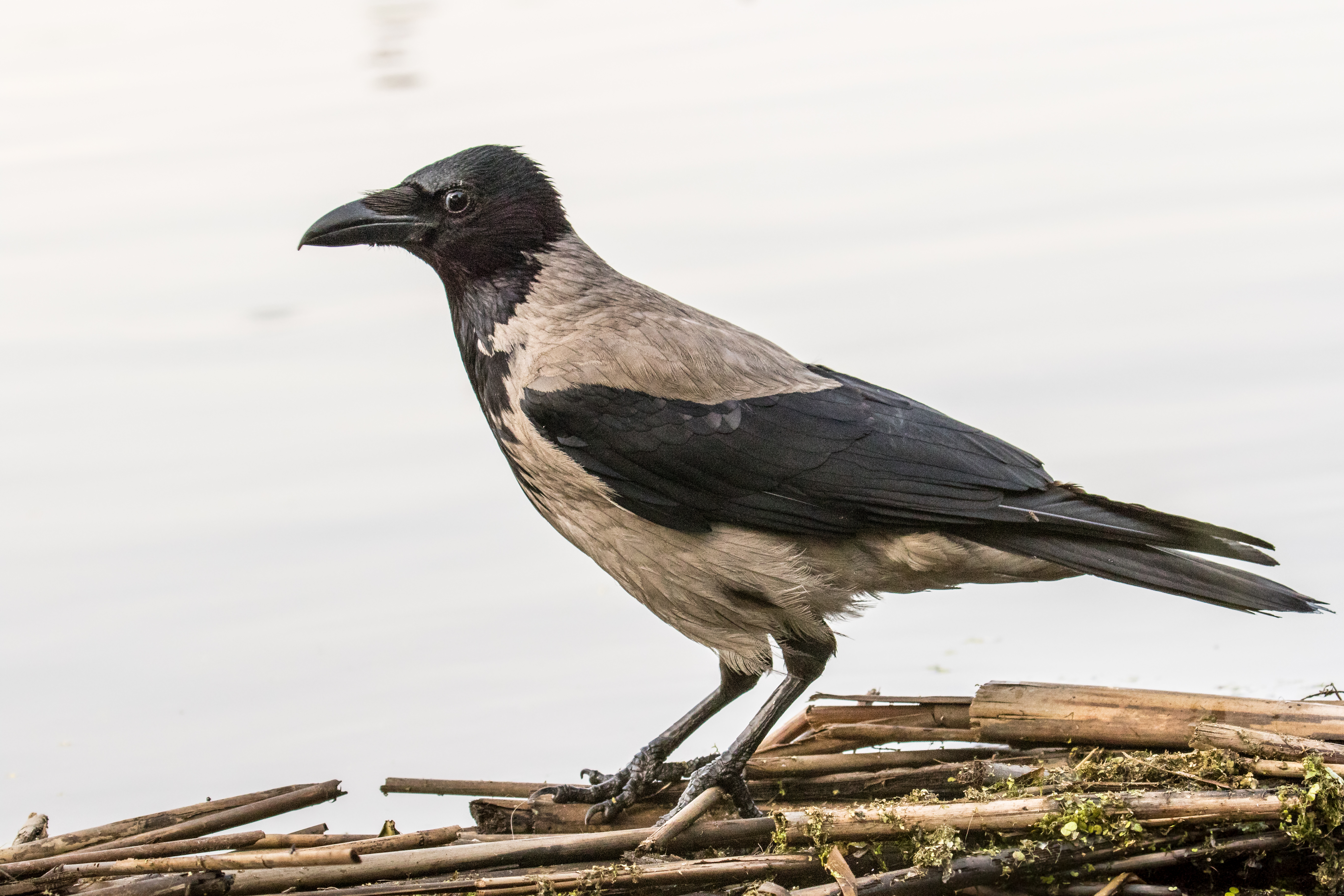
A hooded crow (Corvus cornix)

=== In hooded crows ===
The information centre hypothesis has been studied in hooded crows (Corvus cornix). Hooded crows exhibit communal roosting behaviour and often feed in flocks, making them a good candidate species for studies of the information centre hypothesis. A study conducted by Sonerud, Smedshaug, and Brathen (2001) examined the roost and feeding behaviours of 34 hooded crows over three years, with results supporting the information centre hypothesis. Sonerud et al. created an environment with unpredictable and ephemeral food sources, similar to the natural environment in which the crows live. The study differentiated between 'leader' crows who were knowledgeable about the food site from Day 1, as well as 'followers', who roosted overnight with leaders, and 'naive' crows who did not roost overnight with a leader or visit the food site on Day 1. Notably, they found that compared to naive individuals, follower crows which had not visited the food patch on Day 1 were significantly more likely to visit the patch on Day 2 if they roosted overnight with a leader crow familiar with the food patch, but only if the leader crow returned on Day 2 as well. This indicated that the crows who were unfamiliar with the food patch received information from the leader crows regarding their foraging success, and then followed them to the location the following day. This is supported when compared to the naive individuals who did not roost overnight with the leader, and had significantly lower levels of finding the food source on Day 2.

=== In vultures ===
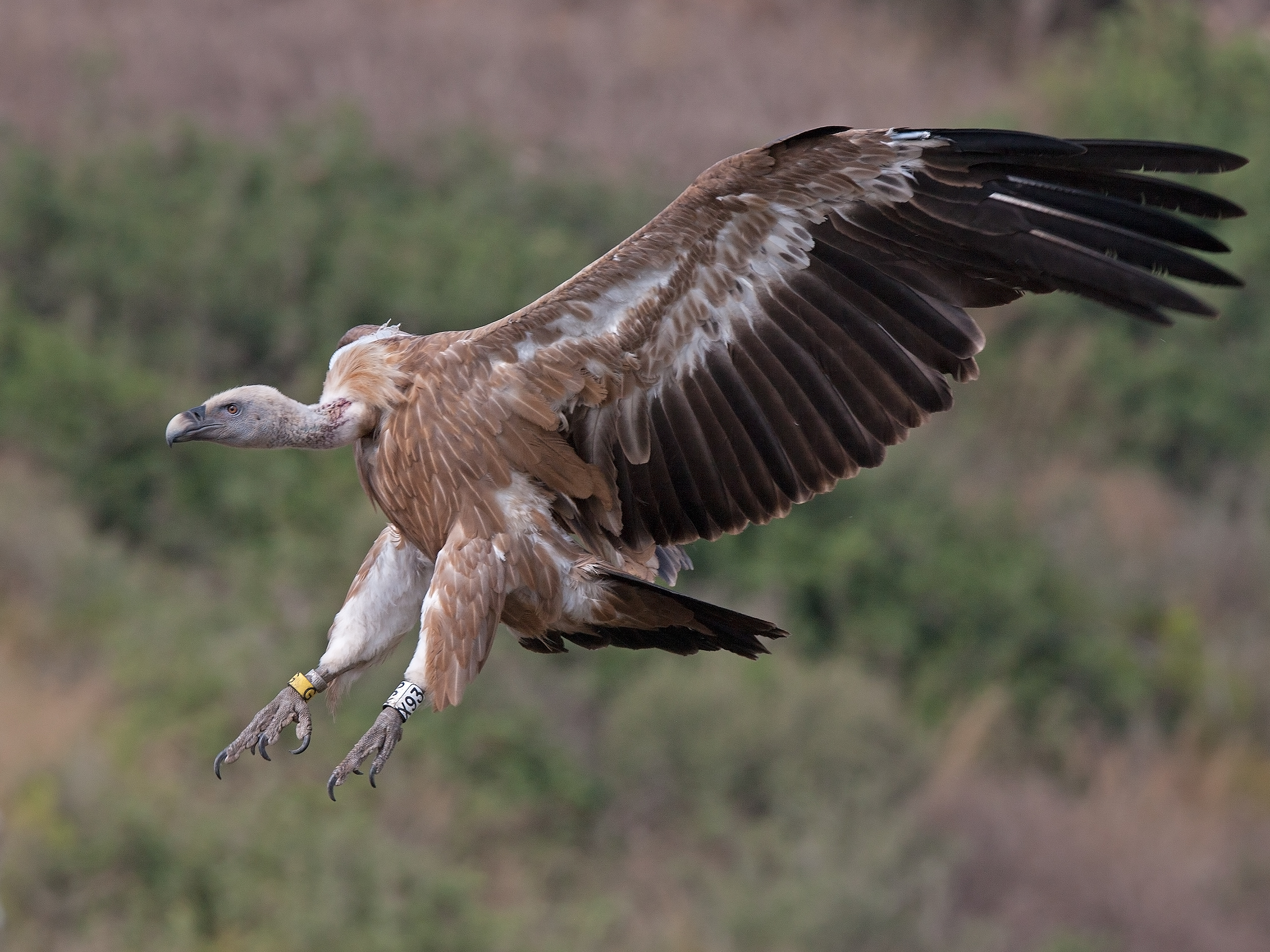
A griffon vulture landing

Studies of the information centre hypothesis have been conducted using the Eurasian griffon vulture (Gyps fulvus) as a test species, due to their communal roosts which may function primarily as information centres. In a study by Harel et al. (2017), movements and behaviour of approximately 200 Eurasian griffon vultures were recorded over a five-year period. This study categorized individual vultures as either 'uninformed', indicating they had no knowledge of a currently available food source, or 'informed', if they had either been at the food source or flown directly over it in the prior two days. Study results showed that uninformed vultures followed informed vultures to successful food sources and thereby gained access to these resources. In addition, a dyad composed of an informed and an uninformed vulture who departed the roost within two minutes of each other, spent a greater amount of airtime at a spatially closer distance than individuals who left the roost on their own, indicating a follow-the-leader relationship.

Further studies have been conducted using other vulture species, such as black vultures (Coragyps atratus) and turkey vultures (Cathartes aura), with results both supporting and refuting the information centre hypothesis. For example, a study by Neil Buckley (1997), black vultures were observed to benefit from communal roosting because they located food by following knowledgeable conspecifics who had previously visited the carcass food source. In the same study, communal benefits as in the black vulture were not observed for the turkey vulture individuals.

== Criticism ==
After its creation in 1973, the information centre hypothesis gained popularity, and with this popularity came criticism. The information centre hypothesis has faced criticism regarding its assumptions and views that the primary purpose of communal roosting is to share information regarding the location of food sources and for unsuccessful individuals to follow successful individuals back to the location. Mock et al., argue that there are other reasons for the communal roosting of birds, such as anti-predator strategies. Multiple studies have found that there was not one primary cause of communal roost development, but that other factors were equally important in the evolution of communal roosting behaviour. A further criticism states that the information centre hypothesis is not valid because it does not represent an evolutionarily stable strategy (ESS).

According to Heinz Richner and Philipp Heeb (1995), the primary issue with the information centre hypothesis is the concept that a successful forager would return to the roost to help other, unsuccessful individuals. They argue that this issue cannot be solved without making assumptions regarding kin benefits, and thus the hypothesis cannot be confirmed to be true. In addition, they note that the information centre hypothesis, as it was originally proposed by Ward and Zahavi, requires the assumption that individuals fluctuate between being leaders and followers, and therefore relies on altruism between individuals. Other literature also criticizes this assumption made in the original hypothesis.

Other studies have found that the information centre hypothesis lays a correct framework for the communal roosting of some species, but should be broadened to include aspects beyond resource knowledge sharing, such as information regarding mates and predators. A review paper by Bijleveld et al. (2009) suggests that broadening the hypothesis to include these other information sharing possibilities better explains the phenomenon of communal roosting. For example, Ward and Zahavi argued that a dramatic aerial display by a bird was an advertisement to others regarding their knowledge of a food source. However, there may be broader implications that the original ICH allows for, such as the advertisement acting as an individual signal of quality to increase the advertising individuals chance of obtaining a high quality mate. This example supports the broadening of the hypothesis on the basis that more information than just food resource location is being shared.
