= Amotz Zahavi =

Israeli evolutionary biologist (1928–2017)

- אמוץ זהבי
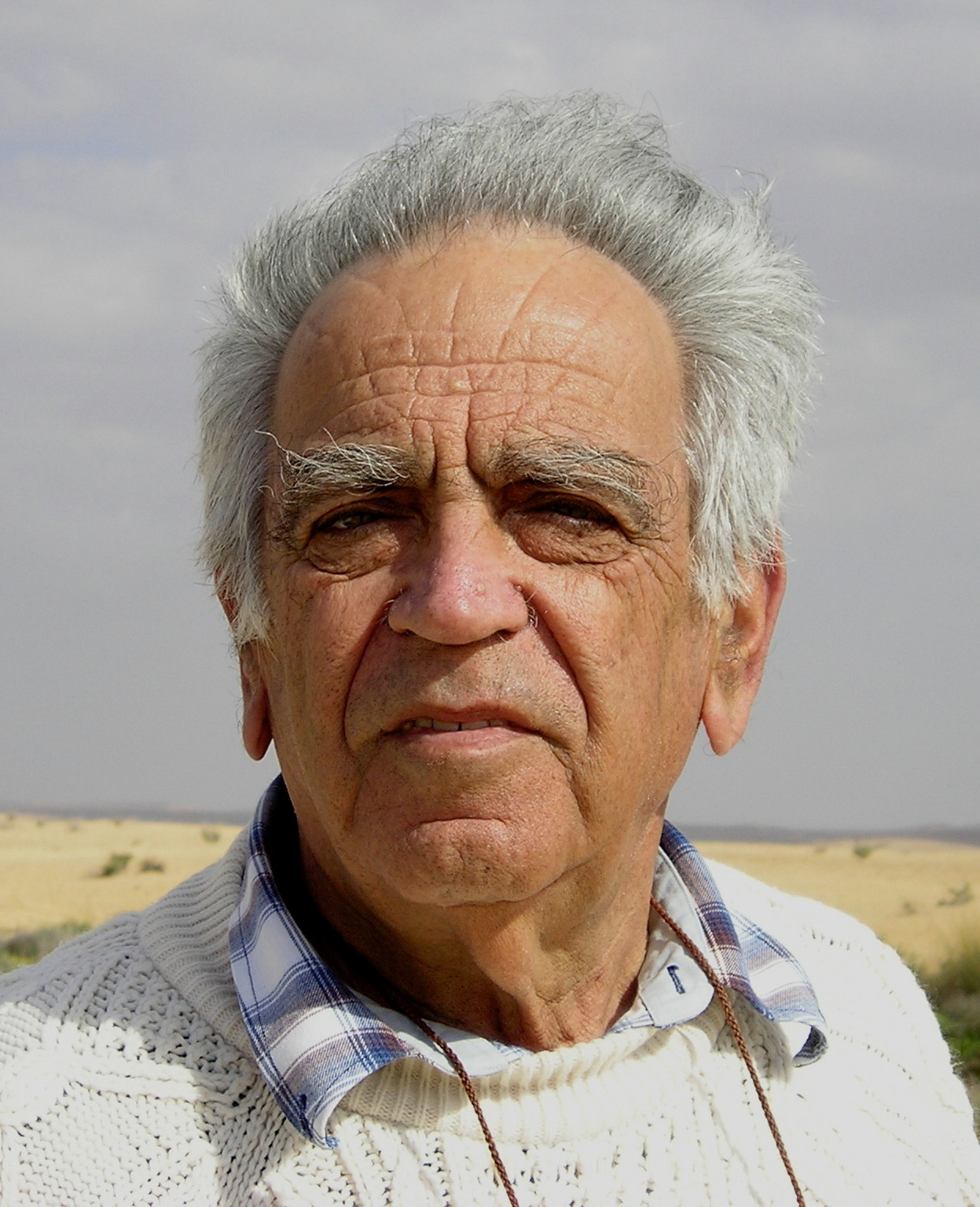
- Zahavi in 2005
- Born: 14 August 1928; Petah Tikva, British Mandate of Palestine
- Died: 12 May 2017 (aged 88); Tel Aviv, Israel
- Education: Tel Aviv University
- Known for: Handicap principle
- Scientific career
- Fields: Biology
- Workplaces: Tel Aviv University

Amotz Zahavi (Hebrew: אמוץ זהבי; 14 August 1928 – 12 May 2017) was an Israeli evolutionary biologist, a professor in the department of zoology at Tel Aviv University, and one of the founders of the Society for the Protection of Nature in Israel. His main work concerned the evolution of signals, particularly those signals that are indicative of fitness, and their selection for "honesty".

== Biography ==
Amotz Zahavi was influenced to study zoology by the director of the zoo at Tel Aviv, Heinrich Mendelssohn. He received his PhD from Tel Aviv University in 1970. He was married to Avishag Zahavi (née Kadman), a biologist and a co-investigator. He died in Tel Aviv, Israel, on 12 May 2017, aged 88.

== Scientific career ==
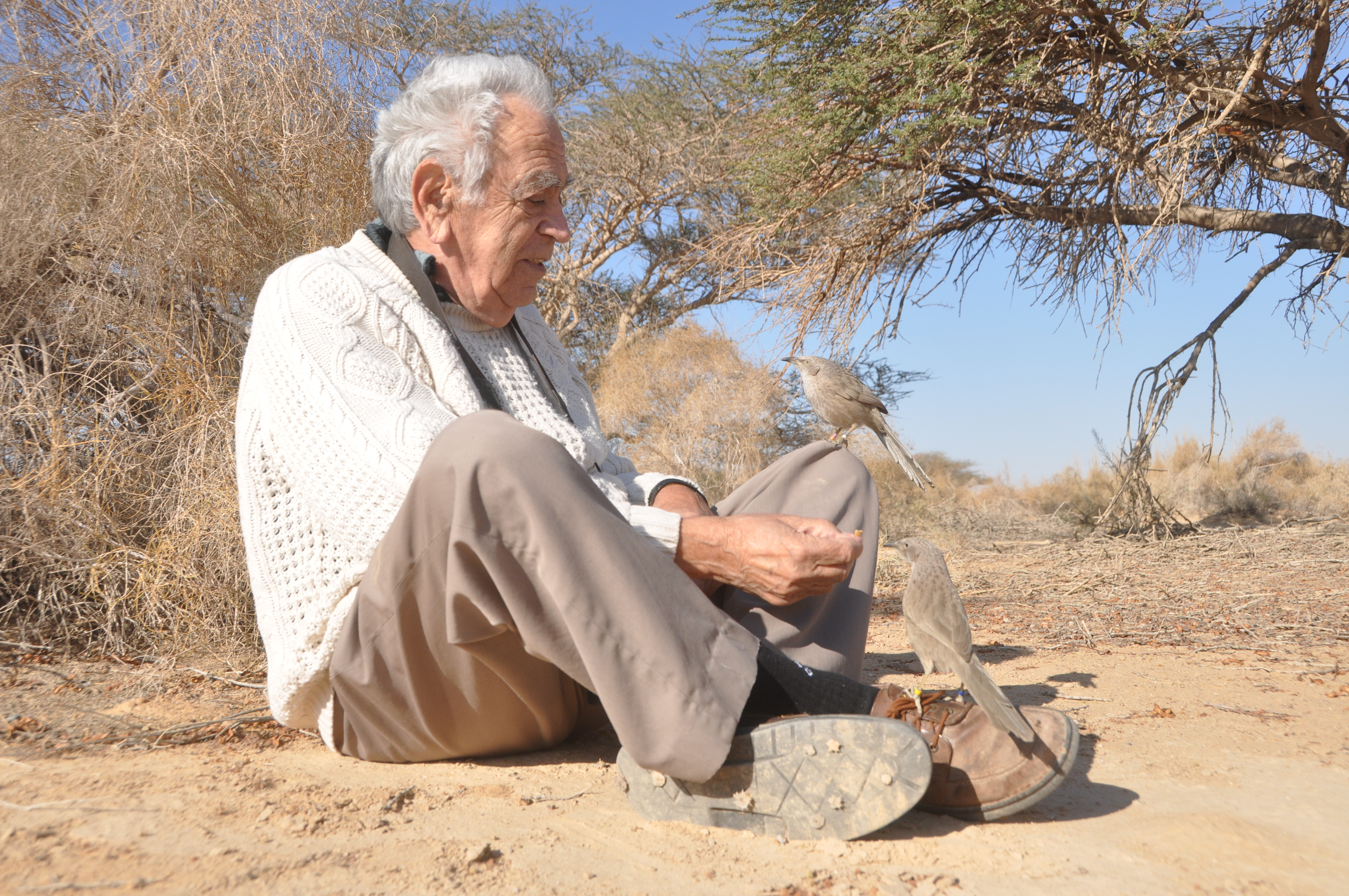
Zahavi with wild Arabian babblers, whose social behavior he studied

Zahavi is best known for his work on the handicap principle, which explains the evolution of characteristics, behaviors or structures that appear contrary to the principles of Darwinian evolution in that they appear to reduce fitness and endanger individual organisms. Evolved by sexual selection, these act as signals of the status of the organism, functioning to e. g. attract mates. He expanded it with theories on honest signalling and the idea that selection would favour signals that impose a higher cost, those that are not easily cheated on. He worked in particular on the Arabian babbler, a long-lived and social bird with altruistic behaviour among unrelated individuals, not explainable by kin selection. Zahavi reinterpreted these behaviours according to his signal theory and its correlative, the handicap principle. The altruistic act is costly to the donor, but may improve attractiveness to potential mates, a form of competitive altruism.

Zahavi is credited with co-developing the information centre hypothesis in 1973 with Peter Ward. The information centre hypothesis states that birds live in communal roosts primarily to gain information on food resource locations from other roost individuals.

Towards the end of his life he attempted to apply his theory at the molecular scale and sought to examine for example whether the neurotransmitter acetylcholine was selected due to its toxicity.

== Awards ==
In 1980, The Society for the Protection of Nature in Israel, Zahavi and two other colleagues, were awarded the Israel Prize for SPNI's special contribution to society and the State, for the environment.

In 2011, Zahavi received the Fyssen Foundation's International Prize for the evolution of social communication.

In 2016, Zahavi received a prize for lifetime achievement from the Israel Society of Ecology and Environmental Sciences.

== Published works ==
- Zahavi, A (1975). "Mate selection - a selection for a handicap". Journal of Theoretical Biology. 53 (1): 205–214. Bibcode:1975JThBi..53..205Z. doi:10.1016/0022-5193(75)90111-3. PMID 1195756.
- Zahavi, A (1977). "The cost of honesty (Further remarks on the handicap principle)". Journal of Theoretical Biology. 67 (3): 603–605. Bibcode:1977JThBi..67..603Z. doi:10.1016/0022-5193(77)90061-3. PMID 904334.
- Zahavi, A. and Zahavi, A. (1997). The handicap principle: a missing piece of Darwin's puzzle. Oxford University Press. Oxford. ISBN 0-19-510035-2

== See also ==
- List of Israel Prize recipients
