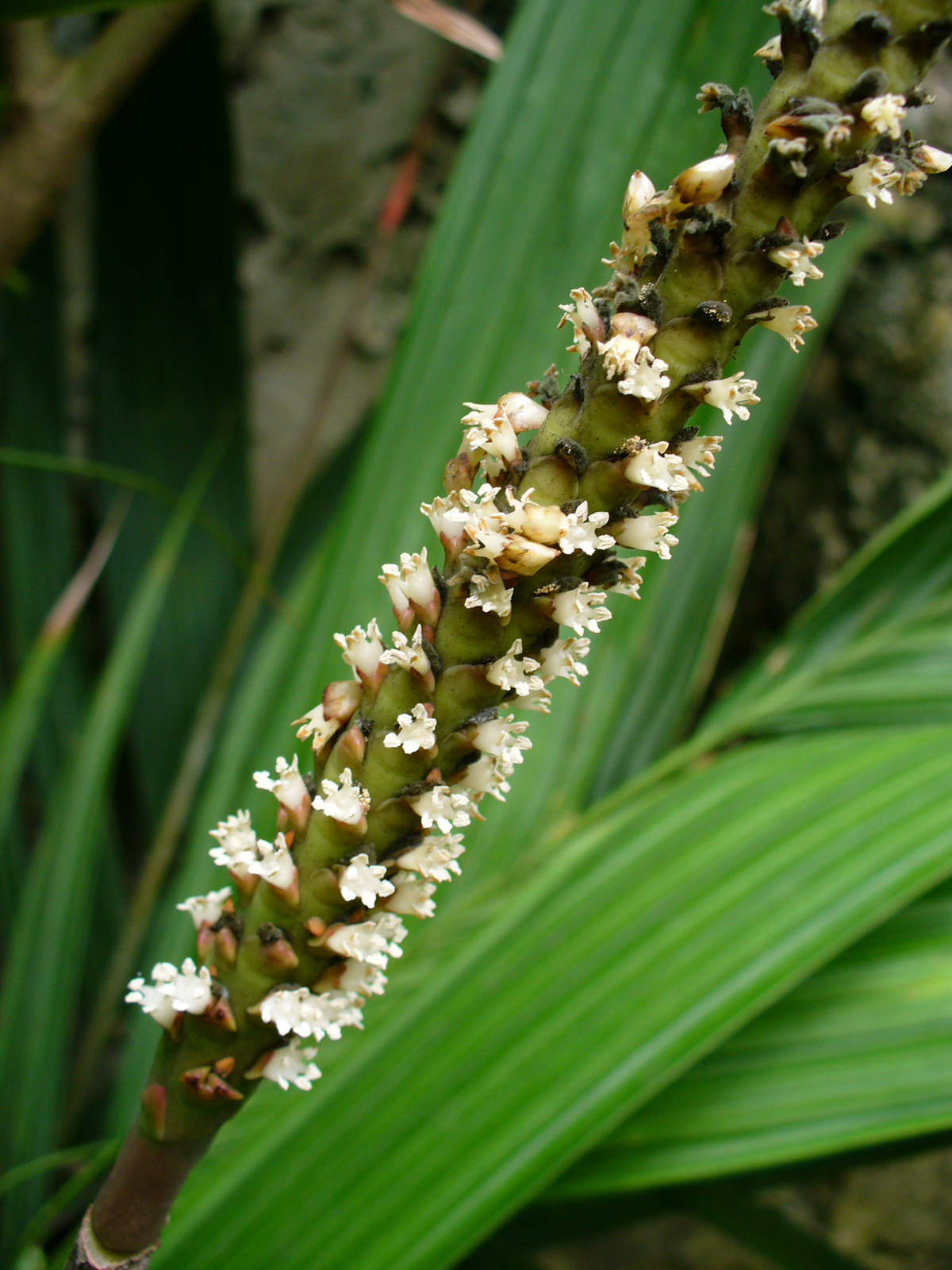

Scientific classification
- Kingdom: Plantae
- Clade: Tracheophytes
- Clade: Angiosperms
- Clade: Monocots
- Clade: Commelinids
- Order: Arecales
- Family: Arecaceae
- Genus: Calyptrogyne
- Species: C. ghiesbreghtiana

Binomial name
- Calyptrogyne ghiesbreghtiana (Linden & H.Wendl.) H. Wendl.

Synonyms
- Geonoma ghiesbreghtiana Linden & H.Wendl.; Geonoma verschaffeltii B.S.Williams; Calyptrogyne ghiesbreghtii H.Wendl.; Calyptrogyne brachystachys H.Wendl. ex Burret; Geonoma glauca Oerst.; Calyptrogyne glauca (Oerst.) H.Wendl.; Calyptrogyne sarapiquensis Schaedtler; Synechanthus sarapiquensis Schaedtler; Geonoma spicigera K.Koch; Calyptrogyne spicigera (K.Koch) H.Wendl.; Geonoma donnell-smithii Dammer; Calyptrogyne donnell-smithii (Dammer) Burret

= Calyptrogyne ghiesbreghtiana =

Coligallo palm

Species of palm

Calyptrogyne ghiesbreghtiana, commonly called the coligallo palm (Spanish for rooster tail, a reference to the form of the leaf), is an understory palm native to Central America and southern Mexico, where it grows in tropical rainforests.

It is a stemless or short-stemmed palm with a trunk up to 2 m tall. The leaves are undivided, or pinnate with 3-9 leaflets, the terminal leaflet with a forked apex. The flowers are produced all year round, on upright inflorescences; they are monoecious, with complete temporal separation of the male and female stages. The flowers are pollinated by bats in the family Phyllostomidae. Because the flowers are made of a sweet chewable tissue (like the pulp of a fruit) they are much favoured by katydids (Tettigoniidae), whose feeding reduces the number of flowers available to be pollinated.

The inflorescences host a species of mite (Acari) which live and reproduce on the inflorescence and travel to new inflorescences by hitching a ride on the flower-visiting bats. The behaviour of parasitising another animal for transport but not food is known as phoresy. A similar phenomenon which has been more comprehensively surveyed are the mites that live in flowers visited by hummingbirds and are phoretic on these flower-visiting birds.

Four subspecies are recognized:

1. Calyptrogyne ghiesbreghtiana subsp. ghiesbreghtiana - Veracruz, Tabasco, Chiapas
2. Calyptrogyne ghiesbreghtiana subsp. glauca (Oerst.) A.J.Hend. - Costa Rica, Panama, Nicaragua
3. Calyptrogyne ghiesbreghtiana subsp. hondurensis A.J.Hend. - Honduras
4. Calyptrogyne ghiesbreghtiana subsp. spicigera (K.Koch) A.J.Hend. - Belize, Guatemala
