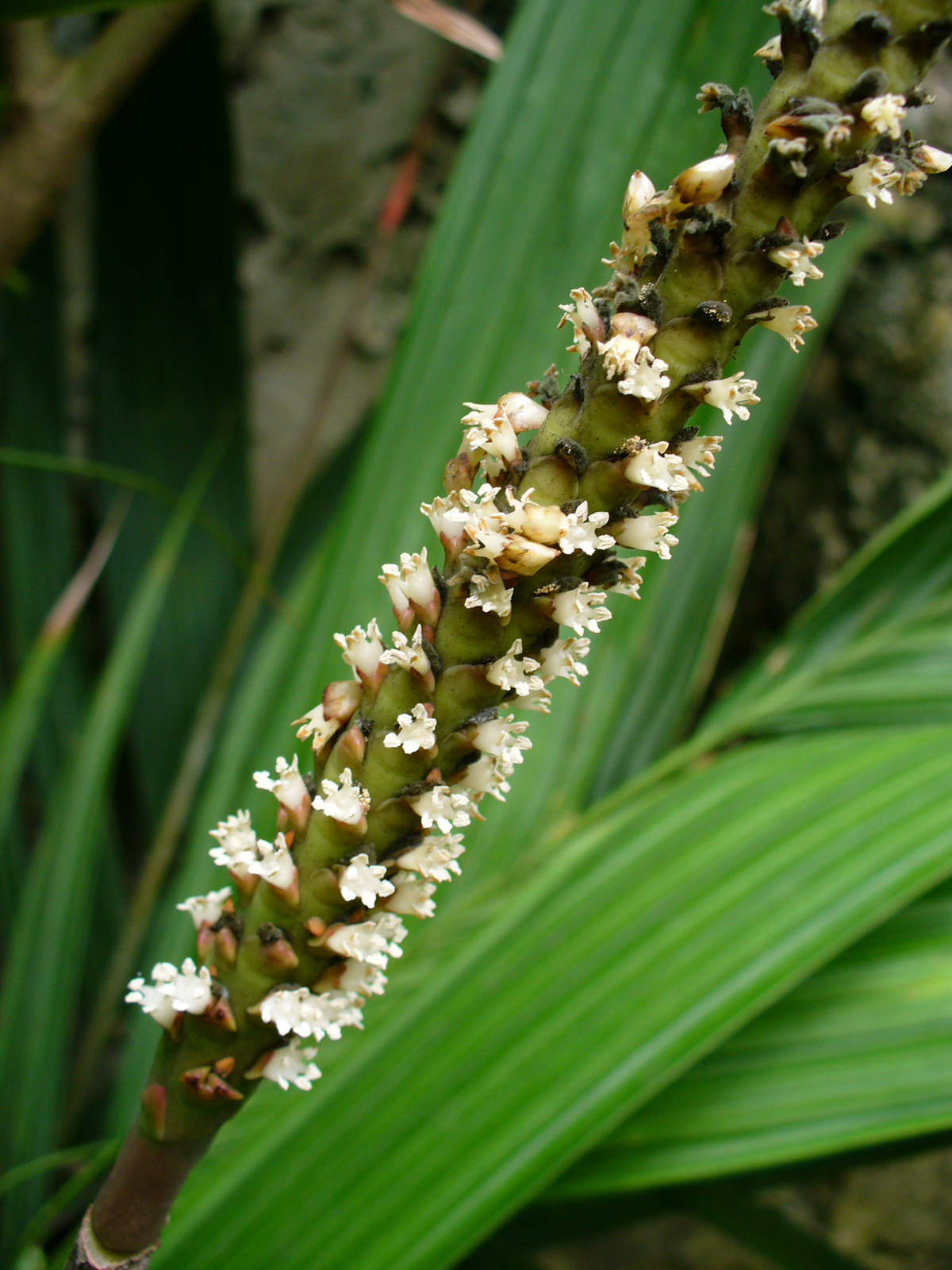
- Calyptrogyne ghiesbreghtiana

Scientific classification
- Kingdom: Plantae
- Clade: Tracheophytes
- Clade: Angiosperms
- Clade: Monocots
- Clade: Commelinids
- Order: Arecales
- Family: Arecaceae
- Subfamily: Arecoideae
- Tribe: Geonomateae
- Genus: Calyptrogyne; H.Wendl.

Type species
- Calyptrogyne spicigera (K. Koch) H. Wendl.

= Calyptrogyne =

Genus of palms

Calyptrogyne is a genus in the palm family (Arecaceae). It is distributed across Central America, Colombia, and southern Mexico, with 11 of the 17 known species endemic to Panama. Calyptrogyne ghiesbreghtiana is the most widespread and best studied species in this genus.

== Species ==
- Calyptrogyne allenii (L.H.Bailey) de Nevers - Panama
- Calyptrogyne anomala de Nevers & A.J.Hend. - Panama
- Calyptrogyne baudensis A.J.Hend. - Colombia
- Calyptrogyne coloradensis A.J.Hend. - Panama
- Calyptrogyne condensata (L.H.Bailey) Wess.Boer - Panama, Costa Rica
- Calyptrogyne costatifrons (L.H.Bailey) de Nevers - Panama
- Calyptrogyne deneversii A.J.Hend. - Panama
- Calyptrogyne fortunensis A.J.Hend. - Panama
- Calyptrogyne ghiesbreghtiana (Linden & H.Wendl.) H.Wendl. - Chiapas, Tabasco, Veracruz, Belize, Guatemala, Honduras, Nicaragua, Costa Rica, Panama
- Calyptrogyne herrerae Grayum. - Costa Rica
- Calyptrogyne kunorum de Nevers - Panama
- Calyptrogyne osensis A.J.Hend. - Costa Rica
- Calyptrogyne panamensis A.J.Hend. - Panama
- Calyptrogyne pubescens de Nevers - Panama
- Calyptrogyne sanblasensis A.J.Hend. - Panama
- Calyptrogyne trichostachys Burret - Costa Rica
- Calyptrogyne tutensis A.J.Hend. - Panama
