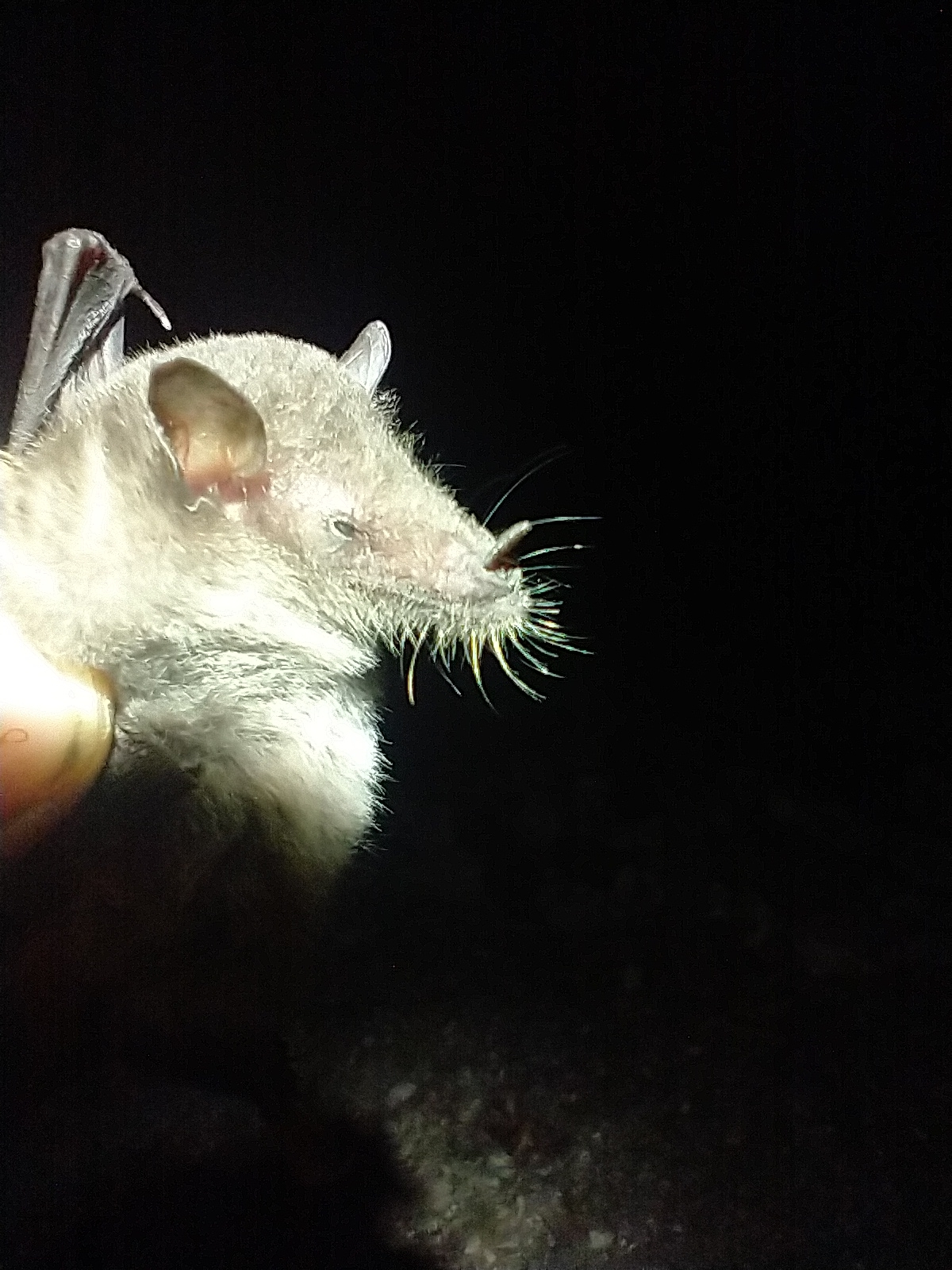

Conservation status
- Least Concern (IUCN 3.1)

Scientific classification
- Kingdom: Animalia
- Phylum: Chordata
- Class: Mammalia
- Order: Chiroptera
- Family: Phyllostomidae
- Genus: Anoura
- Species: A. peruana

Binomial name
- Anoura peruana Tschudi, 1844

Synonyms
- Rhinchonycteris peruana Tschudi, 1844; Anoura geoffroyi peruana Tschudi, 1844; Glossophaga peruana Tschudi, 1844; Anoura geoffroyi apolinari Allen, 1916; Anoura geoffroyi antricola Anthony, 1921

= Anoura peruana =

Species of bat

Anoura peruana is a species of bat from Colombia, Peru and Bolivia. It was elevated to a species in 2010, after previously being considered a subspecies of Geoffroy's tailless bat (A. geoffroyi). The females are larger than the males.

== Taxonomy and etymology ==
It was described as a new species in 1844 by Swiss naturalist Johann Jakob von Tschudi. Tschudi initially placed it in the genus Glossophaga and the subgenus Choeronycteris, with a scientific name of Glossophaga (Choeronycteris) peruana. Beginning in 1878 at latest, it was published as synonymous with Geoffroy's tailless bat. In 2010, however, researchers concluded that A. peruana was morphologically distinct enough to be considered a full species. Its species name "peruana" means "Peruvian."

== Description ==
Several characters were used to differentiate A. peruana from Geoffroy's tailless bat. A. peruana has a larger skull; its zygomatic arches are incomplete; its uropatagium is smaller; and its fur is darker.

== Biology and ecology ==
It is a nectarivorous species of bat. Species of flowers that it visits includes Siphocampylus giganteus, Bomarea multiflora, Leonotis nepetifolia, and Lamourouxia virgata. It could be an important pollen disperser in its ecosystem, as large amounts of pollen have been detected on individuals.

== Range and habitat ==
It is found in several countries in South America, including Bolivia, Colombia, Ecuador, and Peru. It is found at mid- to high-elevation regions of the Andes.
