= Tube-lipped nectar bat =

Tube-lipped nectar bat.

Conservation status
- Data Deficient (IUCN 3.1)

Scientific classification
- Kingdom: Animalia
- Phylum: Chordata
- Class: Mammalia
- Infraclass: Placentalia
- Order: Chiroptera
- Family: Phyllostomidae
- Genus: Anoura
- Species: A. fistulata

Binomial name
- Anoura fistulata Muchhala, Mena-Valenzuela & Albuja, 2005

Species of bat

The tube-lipped nectar bat (Anoura fistulata) is a bat from Ecuador. It was described in 2005. It has a remarkably long tongue, which it uses to drink nectar. It additionally consumes pollen and insects.

== Taxonomy and etymology ==
The tube-lipped nectar bat was first described in 2005. The species name fistulata is derived from the Latin word fistula, meaning "tube". It refers to the bat's lower lip, which extends 3.3–4.8 mm beyond the upper lip and is rolled into a funnel shape. The exact function of the tube-lip is unknown.

== Description ==
The bat has the longest tongue (8.5 cm) relative to its body size of any mammal. Its tongue is 150% the size of its overall body length. By convergent evolution, pangolins, the giant anteater (Myrmecophaga tridactyla), and the tube-lipped nectar bat all have a tongue that is detached from their hyoid bones and extend past the pharynx deep into the thorax. This extension lies between the sternum and the trachea.

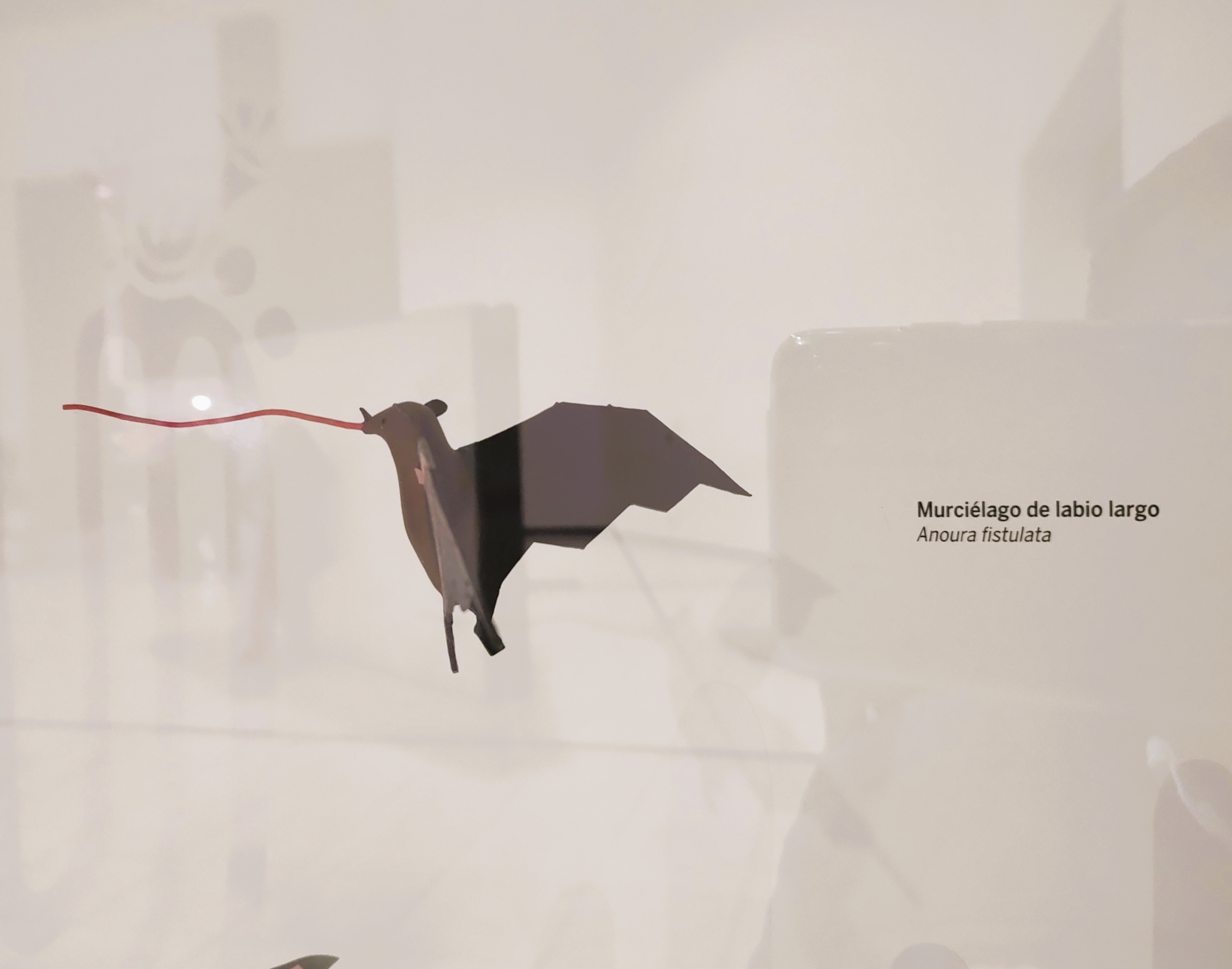
A silhouette model of a tube-lipped nectar bat showcasing its extraordinarily long tongue.

== Biology and ecology ==
Despite its exceptionally long tongue, the tube-lipped nectar bat has a varied diet that includes nectar, pollen, and insects. This arrangement is possible due to its short jaw. The base of the tongue is in the bat's rib cage. One plant, Centropogon nigricans, with its 80– to 90-mm-long corollae, is pollinated exclusively by this bat.

== See also ==
- Geoffroy's tailless bat
- Tailed tailless bat
