= B. lutea =

B. lutea may refer to:

- Banisteriopsis lutea, a psychoactive plant
- Beatonia lutea, a South American plant
- Besleria lutea, a plant with small seeds
- Betula lutea, a birch native to eastern North America
- Blepharoneura lutea, a fruit fly
- Bomarea lutea, a plant endemic to Ecuador
- Borsonia lutea, a sea snail
- Botryosphaeria lutea, a sac fungus
- Brodiaea lutea, a plant native to the United States
- Brontypena lutea, an owlet moth
- Brugmansia lutea, a South American plant
