= Cadena's tailless bat =

Conservation status
- Data Deficient (IUCN 3.1)

Scientific classification
- Kingdom: Animalia
- Phylum: Chordata
- Class: Mammalia
- Order: Chiroptera
- Family: Phyllostomidae
- Genus: Anoura
- Species: A. cadenai

Binomial name
- Anoura cadenai Mantilla-Meluk & Baker, 2006
- Distribution

Species of bat

Cadena's tailless bat (Anoura cadenai) is a species of bat native to Colombia. In 2006 it was described as a separate species from the tailed tailless bat species complex.

== Taxonomy and etymology ==
Cadena's tailless bat was described as a new species in 2006. The holotype had been collected between Calima and Restrepo in Colombia. The species was named after Alberto Cadena, curator of the collection of mammals of the Instituto de Ciencias Naturales (Bogota).

== Description ==
Its fur is a blackish-brown color. Its forearm length is 34–37 mm (1.3–1.5 in).

== Ecology ==
The ecology of this species is poorly understood due to its recent description. Specimens were recorded at relatively high altitudes (between 800 and 1600m), in habitats of the Andean forest with mature trees covered by epiphytes. This species is sympatric with two other species from the genus Anoura : A. caudifer and A. cultrata.

== Range and status ==
Cadena's tailless bat has only been recorded in the Colombian Andes but it is expected that it is also found in Ecuador. As of 2017, it is evaluated as a data deficient species.
