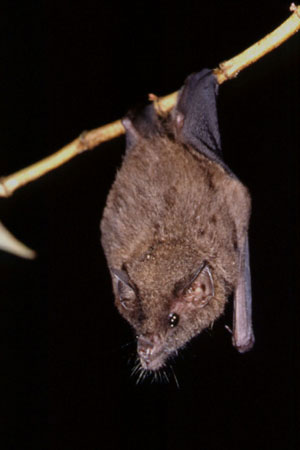
- Geoffroy's tailless bat (Anoura geoffroyi)

Scientific classification
- Kingdom: Animalia
- Phylum: Chordata
- Class: Mammalia
- Order: Chiroptera
- Family: Phyllostomidae
- Subfamily: Glossophaginae
- Genus: Anoura; Gray, 1838

Type species
- Anoura geoffroyi Gray, 1838

Species
- Anoura aequatoris Anoura cadenai Anoura carishina Anoura caudifer Anoura cultrata Anoura fistulata Anoura geoffroyi Anoura javieri Anoura latidens Anoura luismanueli Anoura peruana

= Anoura =

Genus of bats

Anoura is a genus of leaf-nosed bats from Central and South America. Anoura members lack or have a short tail, and are nectarivorous bats of small to medium size among the Phyllostomidae.

== Etymology ==
The genus Anoura was described in 1838 by British zoologist John Edward Gray. The type species for the genus was the Geoffroy's tailless bat, Anoura geoffroyi. The etymology of the genus name Anoura corresponds to the two ancient greek words ἀν- (an-), expressing the "absence" (this prefix is an alpha privative), and οὐρά (ourá), meaning "animal tail". It refers to the tailless character of these bats.

Note that Anoura, the bat genus, should not be confused with neither 'Anura', an order of amphibians, nor 'Anoures', the original spelling of this order.

== Description ==
Anoura species are small, with head and body lengths ranging from 50–90 mm (2.0–3.5 in). Forearm lengths for the genus are 34–48 mm (1.3–1.9 in). They either totally lack tails or have very short tails of 3–7 mm (0.12–0.28 in). They have elongated snouts, as is seen in Glossophaga bat species. Similar again to Glossophaga, these species have tongues with lingual papillae.

== Biology ==
Anoura species consume nectar, pollen, and insects.

== Systematics ==
- Anoura aequatoris– While a 2006 morphological study suggested elevating Anoura caudifera aequatoris to species level, this conclusion has been challenged. Some believe that it is not distinct enough to warrant separation from A. caudifera, and that further analysis is needed. A 2008 study challenged that elevating it to a species overstated the amount of diversity within the genus, and that it should remain a subspecies.
- Cadena's tailless bat, A. cadenai– The same 2006 study as above split A. cadenai away from A. caudifer. It was challenged by the same 2008 study based on the overall small sample size of the 2006 study, and the small morphological differences between A. caudifer and A. cadenai. A. caudifer has subsequently been considered monotypic by others, disregarding A. cadenai.
- Tailed tailless bat, A. caudifer
- Handley's tailless bat, A. cultrata
- Tube-lipped nectar bat, A. fistulata
- Geoffroy's tailless bat, A. geoffroyi
- Anoura javieri
- Broad-toothed tailless bat, A. latidens
- Luis Manuel's tailless bat, A. luismanueli
- Anoura peruana
