= Bomarea ceratophora =

Conservation status
- Endangered (IUCN 3.1)

Scientific classification
- Kingdom: Plantae
- Clade: Tracheophytes
- Clade: Angiosperms
- Clade: Monocots
- Order: Liliales
- Family: Alstroemeriaceae
- Genus: Bomarea
- Species: B. ceratophora

Binomial name
- Bomarea ceratophora Neuendorf

Species of flowering plant

Bomarea ceratophora is a species of flowering plant in the family Alstroemeriaceae. It is endemic to Ecuador, where it is known from only two collections.
