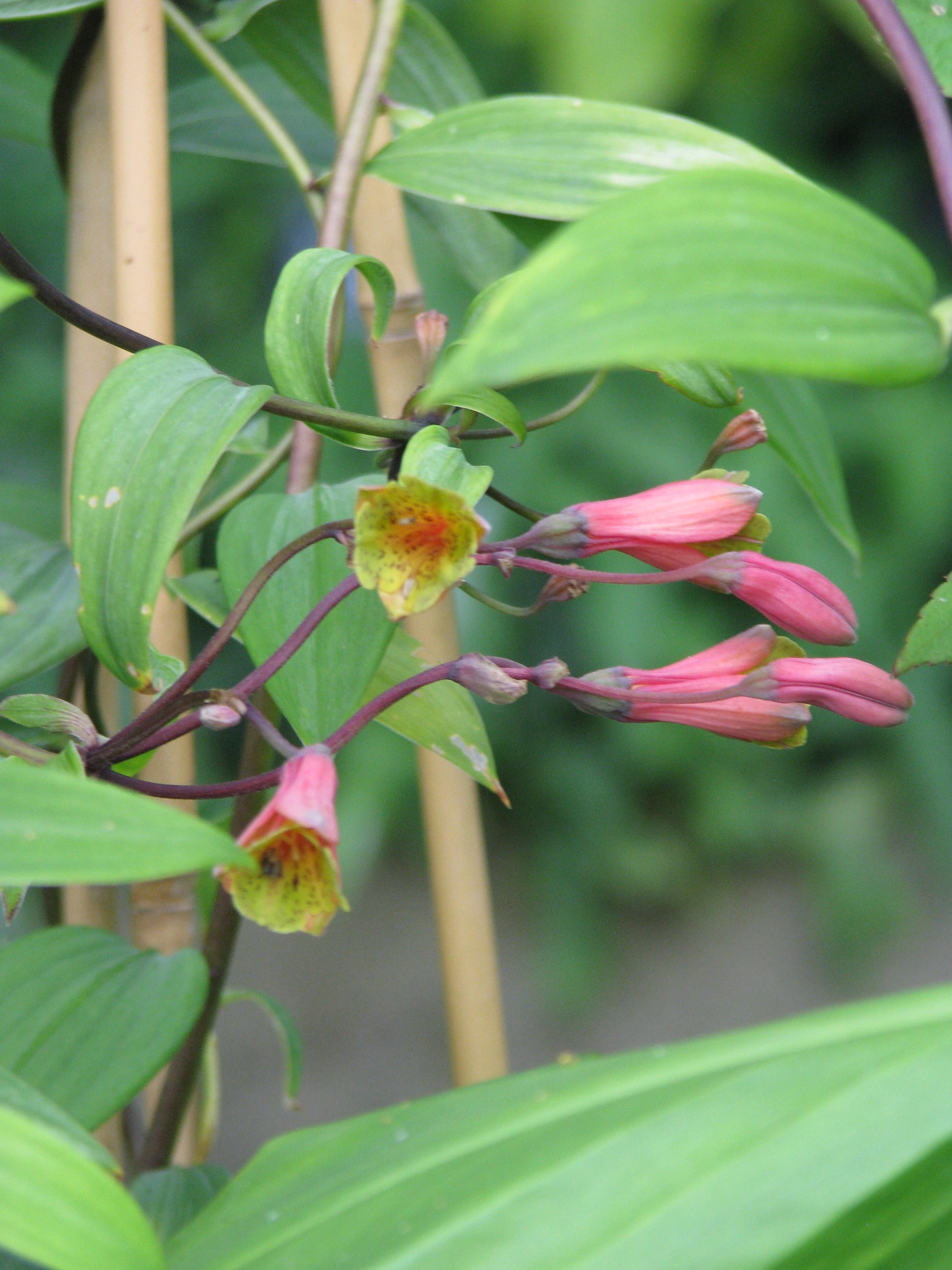
- (peganum 2014)

Scientific classification
- Kingdom: Plantae
- Clade: Tracheophytes
- Clade: Angiosperms
- Clade: Monocots
- Order: Liliales
- Family: Alstroemeriaceae
- Genus: Bomarea
- Species: B. edulis

Binomial name
- Bomarea edulis (Tussac) Herb.

= Bomarea edulis =

Species of flowering plant

Bomarea edulis, common name salsilla, is a species of flowering plant in the alstroemeria family Alstroemeriaceae, that is native to the tropics of Mexico and the United States. A deciduous climber growing to 2.5 metres (8.2 ft) tall and wide, it has lanceolate leaves and clusters of trumpet-shaped flowers in shades of pink, yellow and green, with variable spotting, that are produced throughout the summer.

== Etymology ==
The Latin specific epithet edulis refers to the edible tubers, which are sometimes used as a substitute for potatoes.

== Horticulture ==
B. edulis is grown as an ornamental plant. Though hardy down to −5 °C (23 °F), in temperate regions it is best grown under the shelter of glass, but can be placed outside during the summer months. In 2012 it was awarded the Royal Horticultural Society's Award of Garden Merit.

== Gallery ==
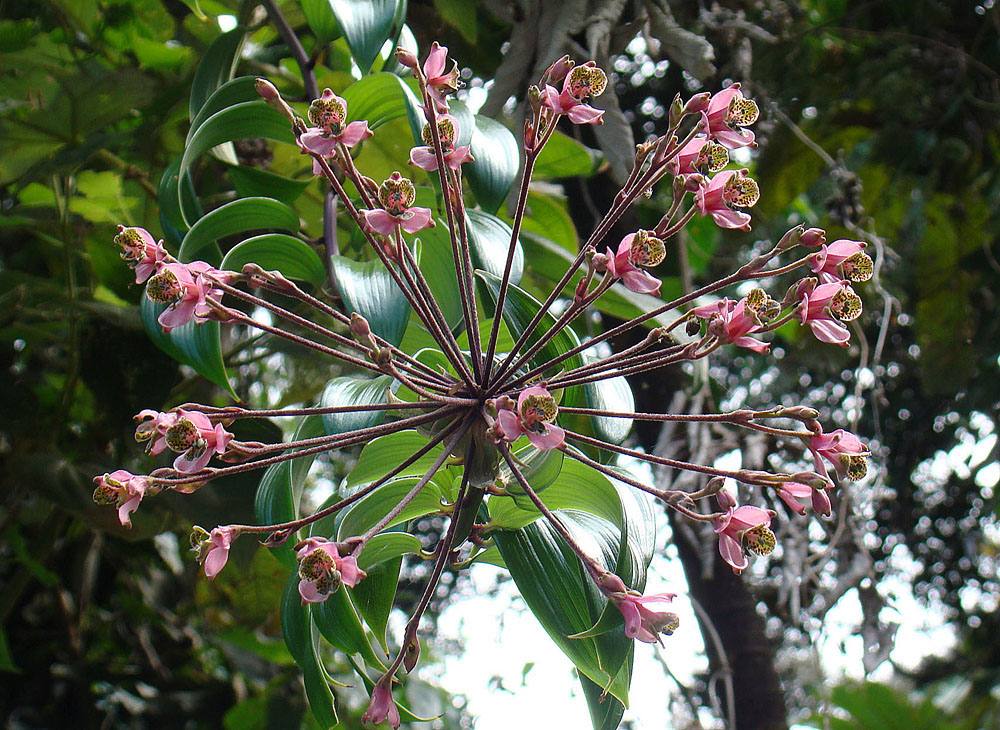

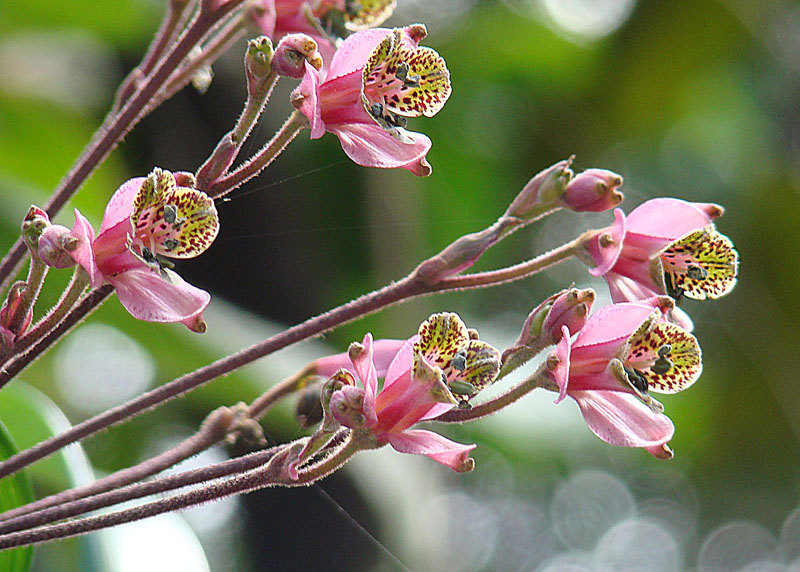

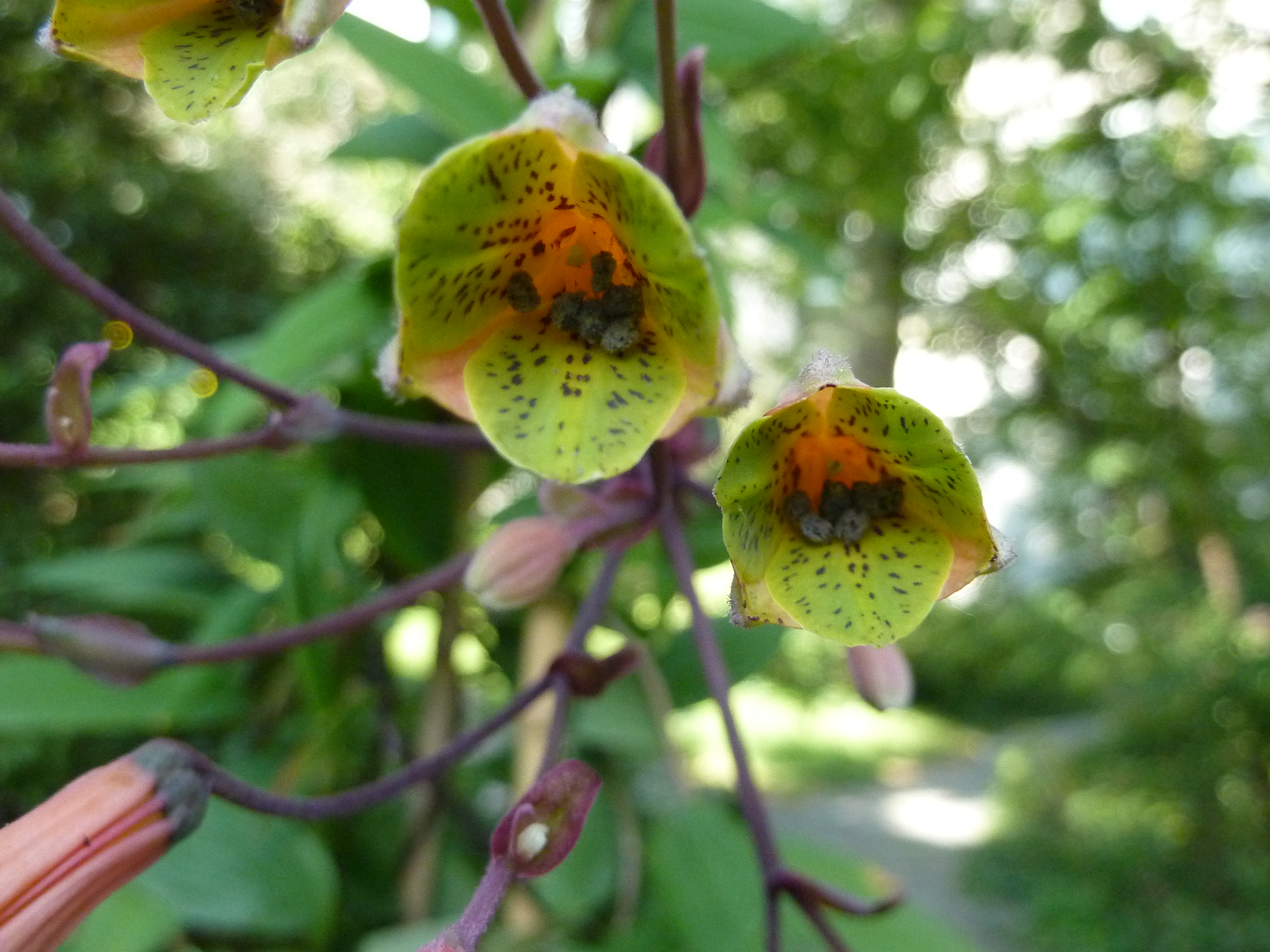
