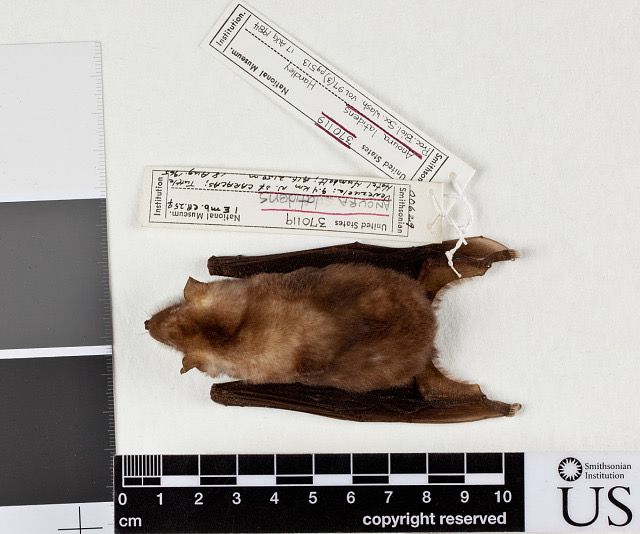
- Stuffed specimen

Conservation status
- Least Concern (IUCN 3.1)

Scientific classification
- Kingdom: Animalia
- Phylum: Chordata
- Class: Mammalia
- Order: Chiroptera
- Family: Phyllostomidae
- Genus: Anoura
- Species: A. latidens

Binomial name
- Anoura latidens Handley, 1984
- Distribution

= Broad-toothed tailless bat =

Species of bat

The broad-toothed tailless bat (Anoura latidens) is a species of bats in the family Phyllostomidae. It is found in Colombia, Peru, and Venezuela.

Unlike many tropical bats that rely on the stable warmth of the lowlands, Anoura latidens have a higher-than-average basal metabolic rate.
