= Bomarea hartwegii =

Conservation status
- Critically Endangered (IUCN 3.1)

Scientific classification
- Kingdom: Plantae
- Clade: Tracheophytes
- Clade: Angiosperms
- Clade: Monocots
- Order: Liliales
- Family: Alstroemeriaceae
- Genus: Bomarea
- Species: B. hartwegii

Binomial name
- Bomarea hartwegii Baker

Species of plant

Bomarea hartwegii is a species of flowering plant in the family Alstroemeriaceae. It is native to Peru and to Ecuador, where it has only been collected twice, in the Pichincha Province. It is threatened by habitat destruction.
