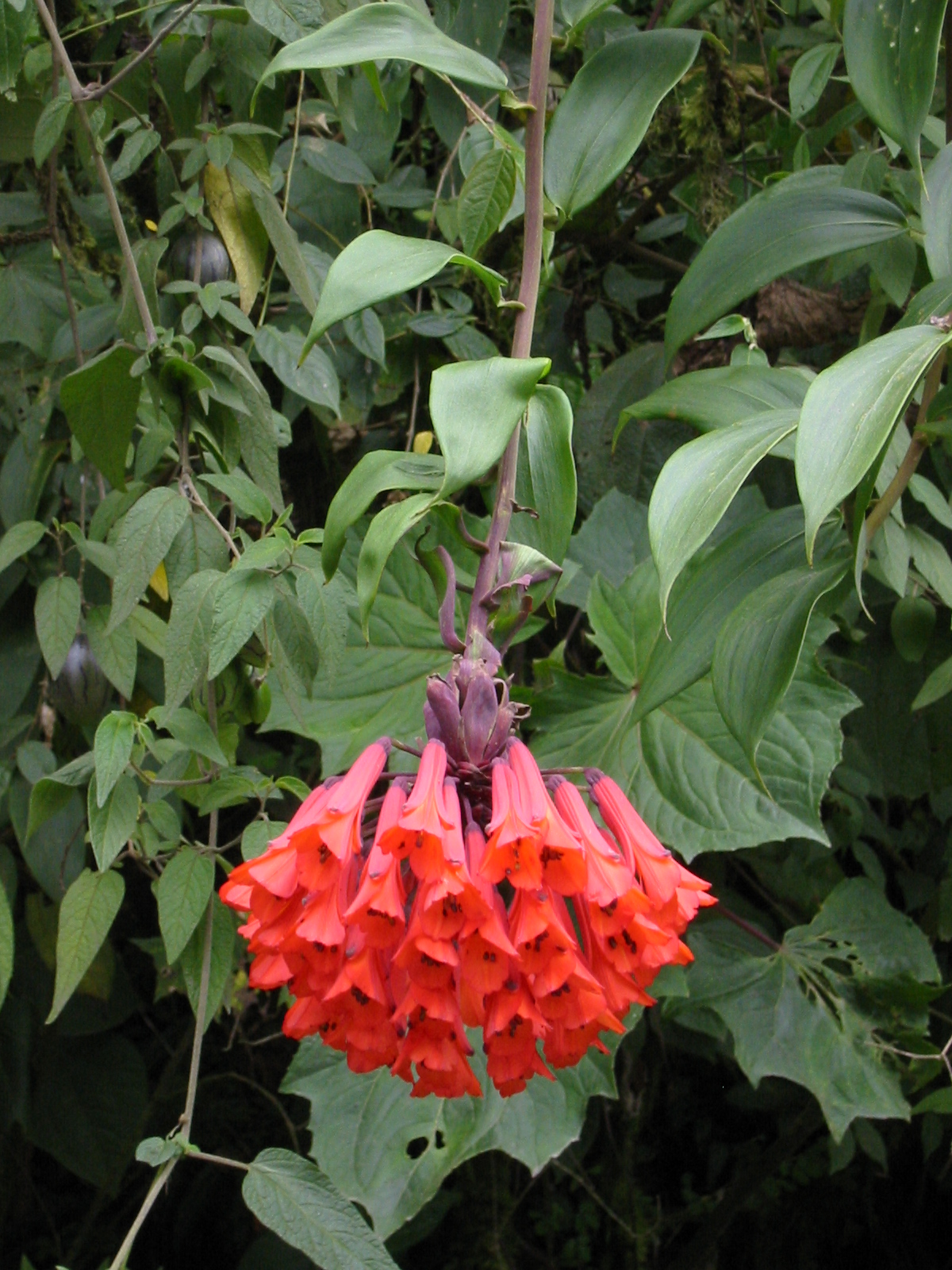
- Bomarea sp., southern Ecuador; Note leaf bases twisted 180°

Scientific classification
- Kingdom: Plantae
- Clade: Tracheophytes
- Clade: Angiosperms
- Clade: Monocots
- Order: Liliales
- Family: Alstroemeriaceae
- Tribe: Alstroemerieae
- Genus: Bomarea; Mirb., 1804

Type species
- Bomarea ovata (Cav.) Mirb.

Synonyms
- Leontochir Phil.; Vandesia Salisb.; Collania Herb. 1837, illegitimate homonym, not Schult. & Schult. f. 1830 nor Broth. ex Sakurai 1941; Sphaerine Herb.; Dodecasperma Raf.; Wichuraea M.Roem.; Danbya Salisb.

= Bomarea =

Genus of flowering plants

Bomarea is one of the two major genera in the plant family Alstroemeriaceae. Most occur in the Andes, but some occur well into Central America, Mexico and the West Indies. Some species are grown as ornamental plants.

== Description ==
=== Vegetative characteristics ===
Bomarea are terrestrial, erect or scandent herbs with resuspinate leaves.

=== Generative characteristics ===
The bisexual flowers have a campanulate to funnel-shaped perianth with free tepals.

== Taxonomy ==
It was published by Charles-François Brisseau de Mirbel in 1802. The lectotype Bomarea ovata (Cav.) Mirb. was designated in 1995. Bomarea is divided into four subgenera, Baccata, Bomarea, Sphaerine, and Wichuraea. The largest is Bomarea with about 70 species.

There are about 110 to 122 species in the genus.

=== Species ===
Species accepted as of July 2014:

| Image | Name | Distribution |
|---|---|---|
| | Bomarea acutifolia | Mexico, Central America |
| | Bomarea albimontana | Peru |
| | Bomarea alstroemerioides | Peru |
| | Bomarea amazonica | Peru |
| | Bomarea amilcariana | Venezuela |
| | Bomarea ampayesana | Peru |
| | Bomarea anceps | Peru |
| | Bomarea andimarcana | Peru, Bolivia |
| | Bomarea andreana | Costa Rica, Panama, Colombia, Ecuador, Venezuela |
| | Bomarea angulata | Ecuador, Peru |
| | Bomarea angustissima | Peru |
| | Bomarea aurantiaca | Peru, Bolivia |
| | Bomarea boliviensis | Bolivia, Argentina |
| | Bomarea brachysepala | Ecuador, Peru |
| | Bomarea bracteata | Peru |
| | Bomarea bracteolata | Panama |
| | Bomarea bredemeyeriana | Colombia, Venezuela |
| | Bomarea brevis | Peru, Bolivia |
| | Bomarea callejasiana | Colombia |
| | Bomarea campanularia | Ecuador, Peru |
| | Bomarea campylophylla | Peru |
| | Bomarea carderi | Panama, Colombia, Ecuador |
| | Bomarea caucana | Colombia |
| | Bomarea caudata | Peru |
| | Bomarea caudatisepala | Panama |
| | Bomarea ceratophora | Ecuador |
| | Bomarea chaparensis | Bolivia |
| | Bomarea chimborazensis | Ecuador |
| | Bomarea chiriquina | Panama, Costa Rica |
| | Bomarea coccinea | Peru |
| | Bomarea colombiana | Colombia |
| | Bomarea cordifolia | Peru |
| | Bomarea cornigera | Peru |
| | Bomarea cornuta | Peru, Ecuador |
| | Bomarea costaricensis | Panama, Costa Rica |
| | Bomarea crassifolia | Colombia, Ecuador, Venezuela, Peru |
| | Bomarea crinita | Peru |
| | Bomarea crocea | Peru |
| | Bomarea densiflora | Peru, Ecuador |
| | Bomarea denticulata | Peru |
| | Bomarea diffracta | Colombia |
| | Bomarea dispar | Peru |
| | Bomarea dissitifolia | Peru, Ecuador |
| | Bomarea dolichocarpa | Peru, Ecuador |
| | Bomarea dulcis | Peru, Bolivia, Chile |
| | Bomarea edulis | widespread across much of Latin America from central Mexico to Argentina, plus West Indies |
| | Bomarea endotrachys | Peru |
| | Bomarea engleriana | Peru |
| | Bomarea euryantha | Colombia |
| | Bomarea euryphylla | Colombia, Ecuador |
| | Bomarea evecta | Ecuador |
| | Bomarea ferreyrae | Peru |
| | Bomarea foertheriana | Peru |
| | Bomarea formosissima | Peru, Bolivia |
| | Bomarea glaucescens | Peru, Ecuador, Bolivia |
| | Bomarea goniocaulon | Peru, Ecuador |
| | Bomarea graminifolia | Ecuador |
| | Bomarea hartwegii | Peru, Ecuador |
| | Bomarea herbertiana | Colombia |
| | Bomarea herrerae | Peru |
| | Bomarea hieronymi | Colombia, Ecuador |
| | Bomarea hirsuta | Costa Rica, Panama, Colombia, Ecuador |
| | Bomarea huanuco | Peru |
| | Bomarea inaequalis | Colombia |
| | Bomarea involucrosa | Peru, Bolivia |
| | Bomarea kraenzlinii | Colombia |
| | Bomarea lancifolia | Ecuador |
| | Bomarea latifolia | Peru |
| | Bomarea libertadensis | Peru |
| | Bomarea linifolia | Colombia, Ecuador |
| | Bomarea longipes | Peru, Ecuador |
| | Bomarea longistyla | Peru |
| | Bomarea lopezii | Venezuela |
| | Bomarea lutea | Ecuador |
| | Bomarea macrocephala | Argentina, Bolivia |
| | Bomarea macusanii | Peru |
| | Bomarea moritziana | Colombia, Ecuador, Venezuela |
| | Bomarea multiflora | Colombia, Ecuador |
| | Bomarea multipes | Ecuador |
| | Bomarea nematocaulon | Peru |
| | Bomarea nervosa | Peru, Ecuador |
| | Bomarea nubigena | Ecuador |
| | Bomarea obovata | Nicaragua, Costa Rica, Panama, Colombia, Ecuador, Peru |
| | Bomarea ovallei | Atacama |
| | Bomarea ovata | Argentina, Bolivia, Peru |
| | Bomarea oxytepala | Ecuador |
| | Bomarea pardina | Colombia, Peru |
| | Bomarea parvifolia | Peru |
| | Bomarea patacoensis | Ecuador |
| | Bomarea patinii | Colombia, Ecuador |
| | Bomarea pauciflora | Colombia, Venezuela |
| | Bomarea perglabra | Ecuador |
| | Bomarea peruviana | Peru |
| | Bomarea porrecta | Peru |
| | Bomarea pseudopurpurea | Peru |
| | Bomarea pudibunda | Colombia |
| | Bomarea pumila | Bolivia, Peru |
| | Bomarea puracensis | Colombia |
| | Bomarea purpurea | Colombia, Venezuela, Ecuador, Peru |
| | Bomarea rosea | Peru |
| | Bomarea salicifolia | Venezuela |
| | Bomarea salsilla | Chile |
| | Bomarea secundifolia | Peru |
| | Bomarea setacea | Peru |
| | Bomarea shuttleworthii | Colombia |
| | Bomarea speciosa | Peru |
| | Bomarea spissiflora | Ecuador, Peru |
| | Bomarea stans | Argentina, Bolivia |
| | Bomarea suberecta | Panama, Costa Rica |
| | Bomarea superba | Peru |
| | Bomarea tarmensis | Peru |
| | Bomarea torta | Ecuador, Peru |
| | Bomarea tribrachiata | Ecuador, Peru |
| | Bomarea trichophylla | Colombia |
| | Bomarea trimorphophylla | Ecuador |
| | Bomarea truxillensis | Venezuela |
| | Bomarea uncifolia | Ecuador |
| | Bomarea vargasii | Peru |
| | Bomarea velascoana | Peru |
| | Bomarea vitellina | Colombia |
| | Bomarea weigendii | Peru |

=== Etymology ===
The generic name Bomarea honours Jacques Christophe Valmont de Bomare (1731-1807).

== Ecology ==
=== Habitat ===
Bomarea grow in shaded conditions of tropical forest understory.

=== Pollination and seed dispersal ===
The flowers are ornithophilous and the seeds are dispersed by animals.

=== As invasive plants ===
In New Zealand, Bomarea has become invasive.
