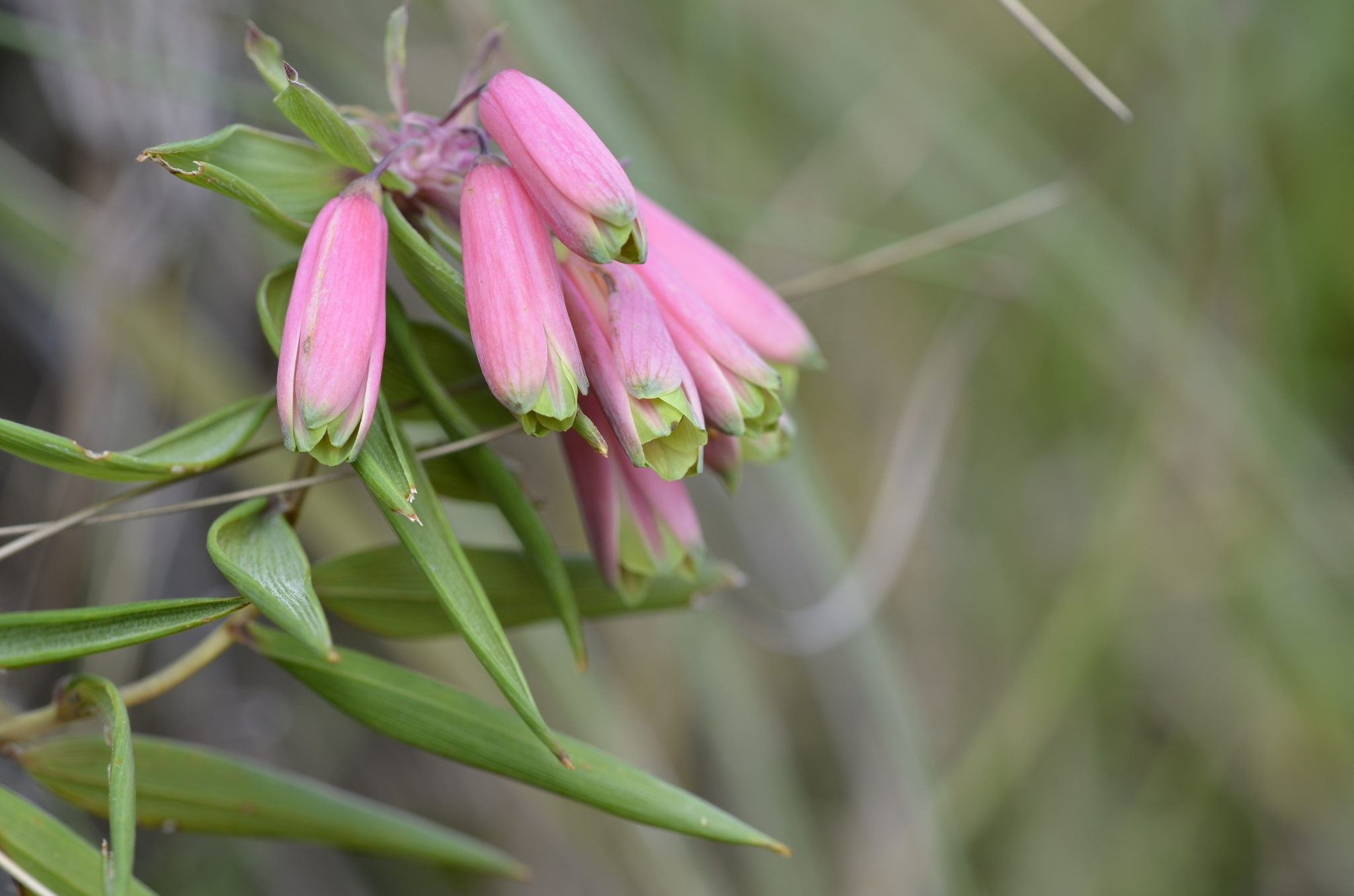

Conservation status
- Endangered (IUCN 3.1)

Scientific classification
- Kingdom: Plantae
- Clade: Tracheophytes
- Clade: Angiosperms
- Clade: Monocots
- Order: Liliales
- Family: Alstroemeriaceae
- Genus: Bomarea
- Species: B. uncifolia

Binomial name
- Bomarea uncifolia Herb.

Synonyms
- Bomarea gracilis Sodiro; Bomarea lobbiana Kraenzl.; Bomarea platypetala Benth.

= Bomarea uncifolia =

Species of flowering plant

Bomarea uncifolia is a species of flowering plant in the family Alstroemeriaceae. It is endemic to Ecuador. Its natural habitat is subtropical or tropical moist montane forests. It is threatened by habitat loss.
