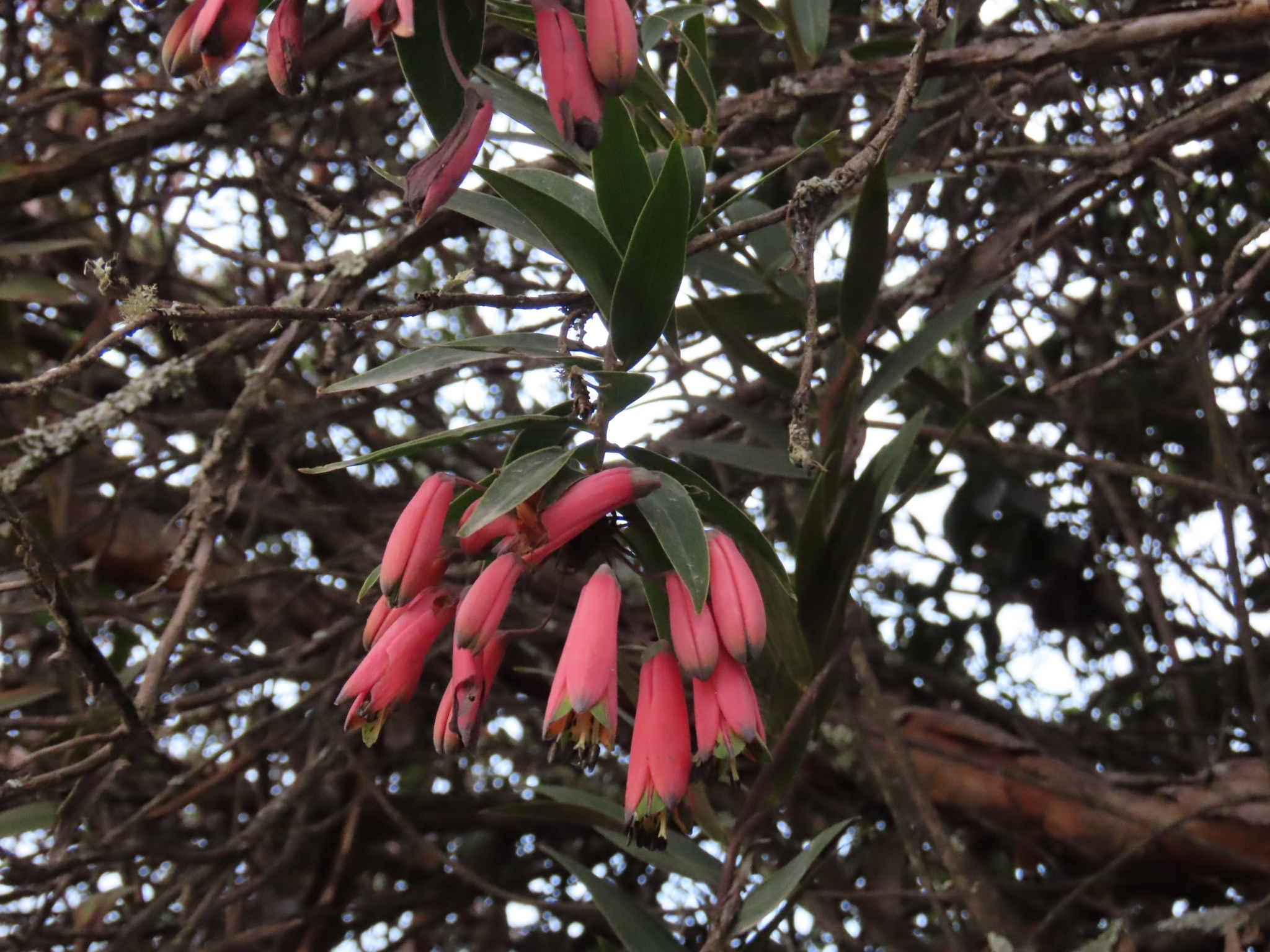

Conservation status
- Critically Endangered (IUCN 3.1)

Scientific classification
- Kingdom: Plantae
- Clade: Tracheophytes
- Clade: Angiosperms
- Clade: Monocots
- Order: Liliales
- Family: Alstroemeriaceae
- Genus: Bomarea
- Species: B. goniocaulon

Binomial name
- Bomarea goniocaulon Baker

= Bomarea goniocaulon =

Species of plant

Bomarea goniocaulon is a species of flowering plant in the family Alstroemeriaceae. It is native to Peru and to Ecuador, where it has been collected only three times in the Pichincha Province. It is known from mountain forest habitat.
