= Luis Manuel's tailless bat =

Conservation status
- Least Concern (IUCN 3.1)

Scientific classification
- Kingdom: Animalia
- Phylum: Chordata
- Class: Mammalia
- Order: Chiroptera
- Family: Phyllostomidae
- Genus: Anoura
- Species: A. luismanueli

Binomial name
- Anoura luismanueli Molinari, 1994
- Distribution

Species of bat

Luis Manuel's tailless bat (Anoura luismanueli) is a species of bat in the family Phyllostomidae. It is endemic to Venezuela and the eastern slope of the Cordillera Oriental of Colombia.
