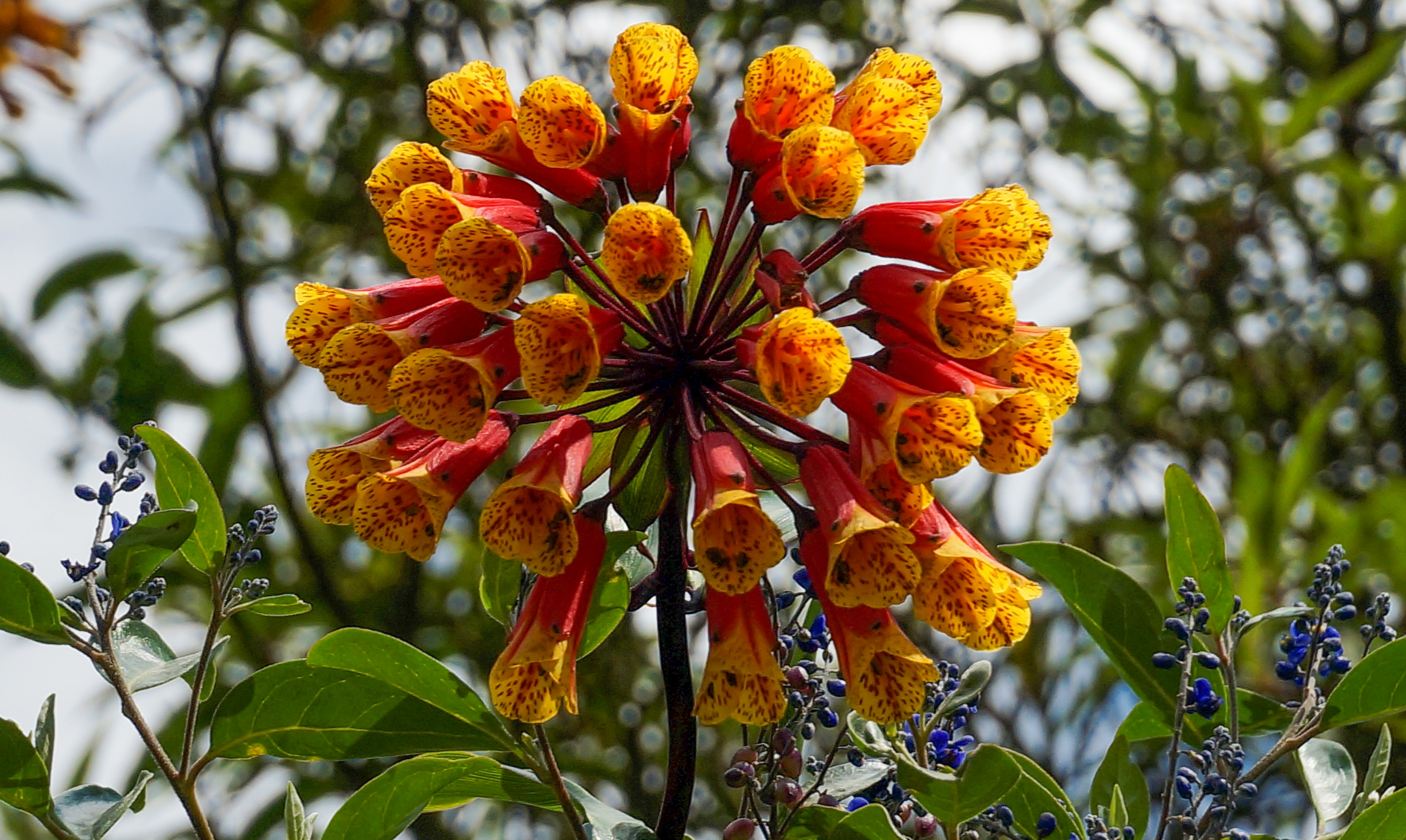

Conservation status
- Near Threatened (IUCN 3.1)

Scientific classification
- Kingdom: Plantae
- Clade: Tracheophytes
- Clade: Angiosperms
- Clade: Monocots
- Order: Liliales
- Family: Alstroemeriaceae
- Genus: Bomarea
- Species: B. glaucescens

Binomial name
- Bomarea glaucescens (Kunth) Baker

Synonyms
- Alstroemeria glaucescens Kunth in F.W.H.von Humboldt, A.J.A.Bonpland & C.S.Kunth; Collania glaucescens (Kunth) Herb.; Wichuraea glaucescens (Kunth) M.Roem.

= Bomarea glaucescens =

Species of plant

Bomarea glaucescens is a species of flowering plant in the family Alstroemeriaceae. It is native to Peru, Bolivia and Ecuador. It grows in wet páramo habitat among Polylepis and next to lakes, as well as grassy páramo and Andean forests. It is not a threatened species but some populations are vulnerable to habitat destruction as the páramo is converted to pasture and pine and eucalyptus plantations.
