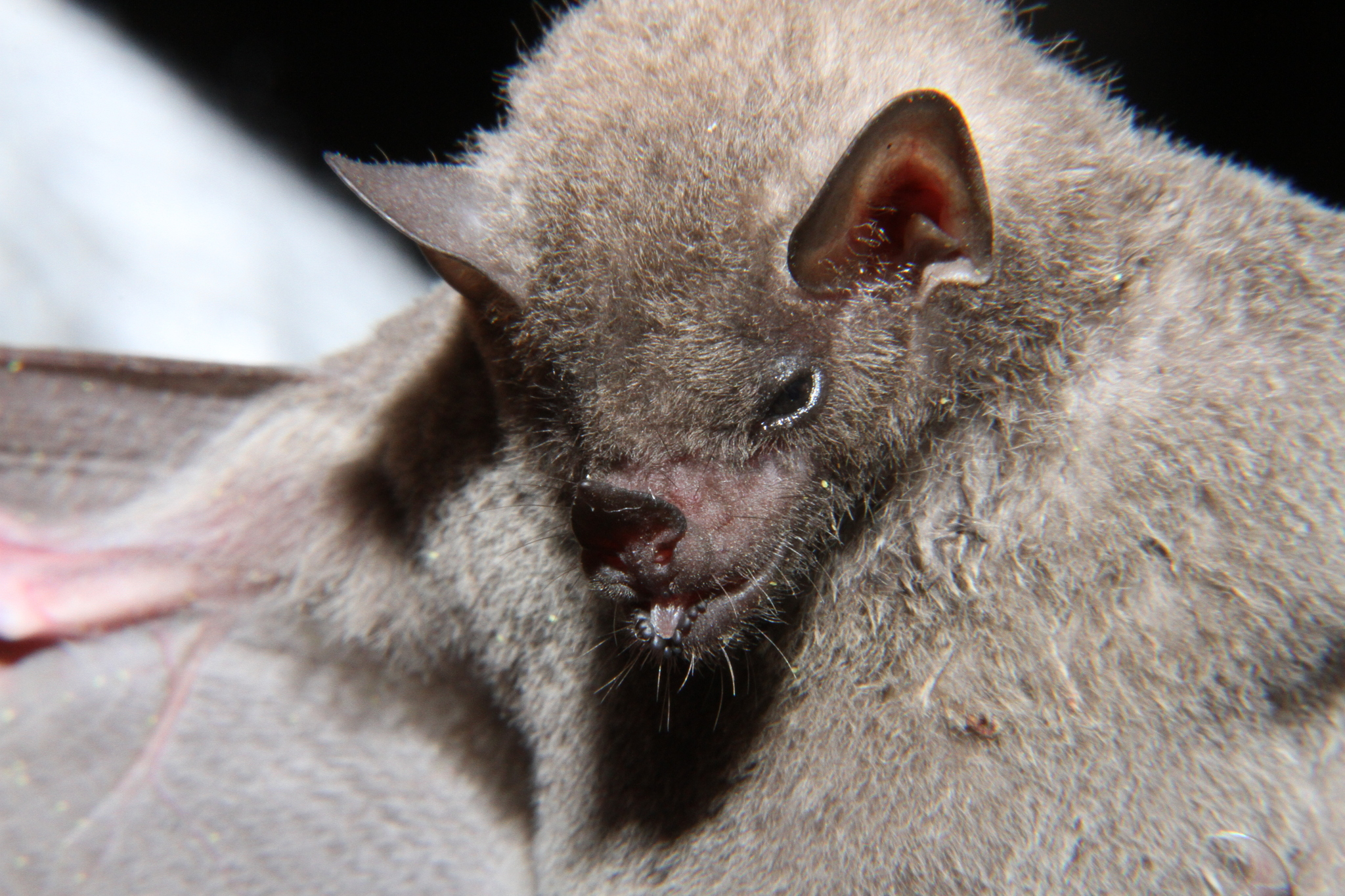

Conservation status
- Least Concern (IUCN 3.1)

Scientific classification
- Kingdom: Animalia
- Phylum: Chordata
- Class: Mammalia
- Order: Chiroptera
- Family: Phyllostomidae
- Genus: Glossophaga
- Species: G. leachii

Binomial name
- Glossophaga leachii Gray, 1844

= Gray long-tongued bat =

Species of bat

The gray long-tongued bat (Glossophaga leachii) is a species of bat in the family Phyllostomidae. It is found in Costa Rica, El Salvador, Guatemala, Honduras, Mexico, and Nicaragua.
