= Tigridia matudae =

Scientific classification
- Kingdom: Plantae
- Clade: Tracheophytes
- Clade: Angiosperms
- Clade: Monocots
- Order: Asparagales
- Family: Iridaceae
- Genus: Tigridia
- Species: T. matudae

Binomial name
- Tigridia matudae Molseed

Species of flowering plant

Tigridia matudae is a rare plant species known from only two locations in Mexico, in a small region along the boundary between the State of Mexico and Morelos. Both sites are at high elevations in the mountains, at altitudes of 2900–3000 m, in forests of Pinus and Abies. One is within Zempoala Lakes National Park. The species is a bulb-forming perennial up to 90 cm tall. Leaves are narrow and tapering. Flowers are pale lilac, up to 3 cm in diameter, blooming in August and September.
