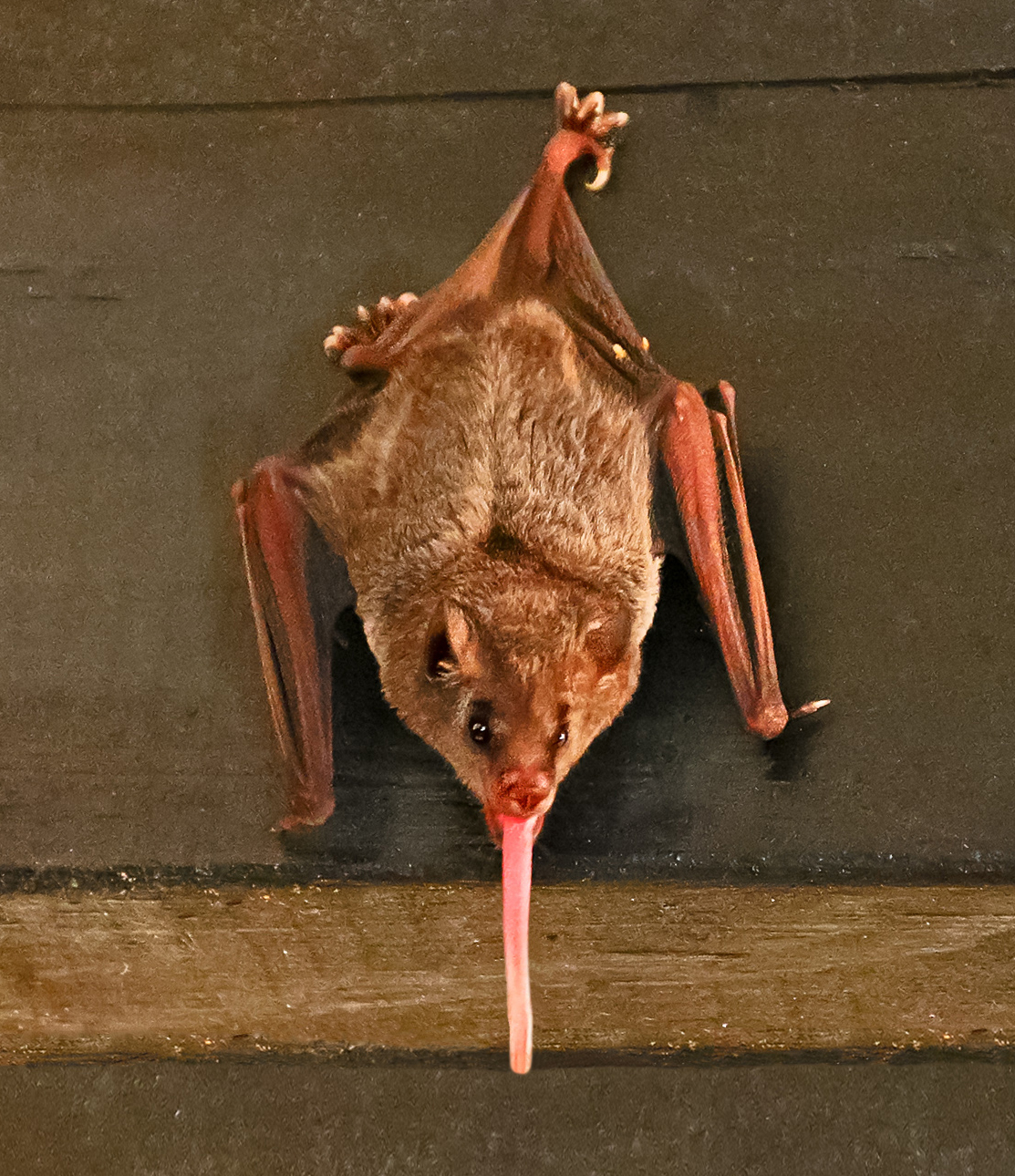

Conservation status
- Least Concern (IUCN 3.1)

Scientific classification
- Kingdom: Animalia
- Phylum: Chordata
- Class: Mammalia
- Order: Chiroptera
- Family: Phyllostomidae
- Genus: Glossophaga
- Species: G. soricina

Binomial name
- Glossophaga soricina Pallas, 1766

= Pallas's long-tongued bat =

Species of bat

Pallas's long-tongued bat (Glossophaga soricina) is a South and Central American bat with a fast metabolism that feeds on nectar.

== Metabolism ==
It has the fastest metabolism ever recorded in a mammal, similar to those of hummingbirds. Although it uses 50% of its stored fat over the course of a day, over 80% of its energy comes directly from the simple sugars that compose its diet of nectar, without being stored in any form. It will also feed on pollen, flower parts, fruit and insects.

== Tongue ==
A 2013 study determined that their tongues have a mopping ability that is powered by blood, a phenomenon unique in nature. Elongated hairs at the tongue's tip, which normally lie flat, become engorged with blood when the tongue is protruded. As a result, the hairs stand in erect rows, perpendicular to the tongue. The tongue tip increases by over 50 percent in length, contracting its width to squeeze enlarged vascular sinuses along the tongue's length, that are directly connected to the hairs. During this process tissue capillaries turn from pink (little blood) to dark red. The blood vessel networks that enter the tip of the tongue are fringed by muscle fibers, which contract to compress the blood vessels and displace blood towards the tip. The efficiency of this feeding mechanism is believed to enable the bats' survival on limited food sources.
