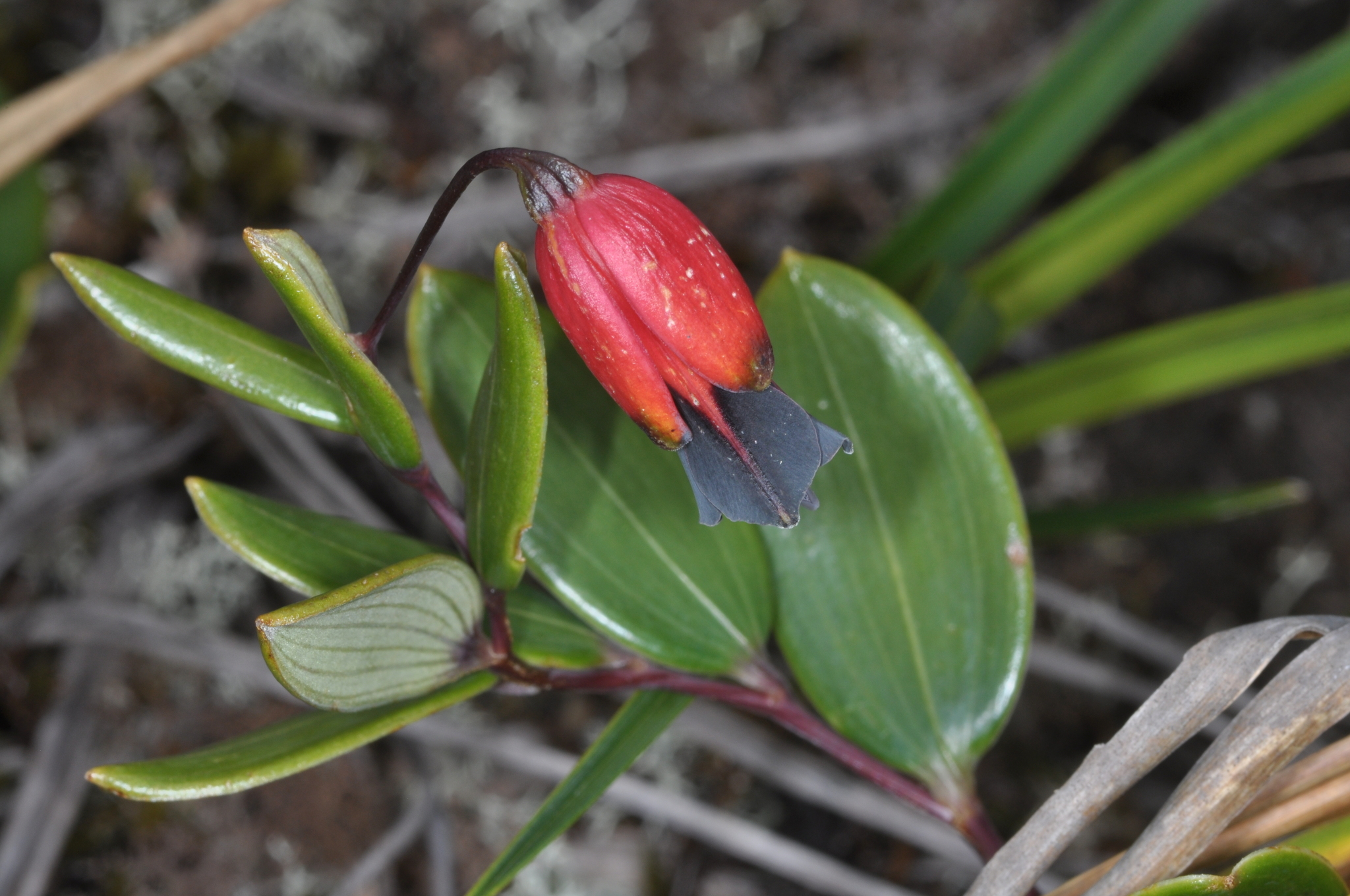

Conservation status
- Near Threatened (IUCN 3.1)

Scientific classification
- Kingdom: Plantae
- Clade: Tracheophytes
- Clade: Angiosperms
- Clade: Monocots
- Order: Liliales
- Family: Alstroemeriaceae
- Genus: Bomarea
- Species: B. brachysepala

Binomial name
- Bomarea brachysepala Benth.

Synonyms
- Bomarea podopetala Baker

= Bomarea brachysepala =

Species of plant

Bomarea brachysepala is a species of flowering plant in the family Alstroemeriaceae. It is native to Peru and Ecuador. It grows in mountain forest habitat in the Andes. It is threatened by destruction of habitat caused by deforestation and mining.
