= Bomarea chimborazensis =

Conservation status
- Endangered (IUCN 3.1)

Scientific classification
- Kingdom: Plantae
- Clade: Tracheophytes
- Clade: Angiosperms
- Clade: Monocots
- Order: Liliales
- Family: Alstroemeriaceae
- Genus: Bomarea
- Species: B. chimborazensis

Binomial name
- Bomarea chimborazensis Baker

Species of flowering plant

Bomarea chimborazensis is a species of flowering plant in the family Alstroemeriaceae. It is endemic to Ecuador. It is a plant of páramo habitat. It is threatened by fires set by people.
