= Anoura aequatoris =

Conservation status
- Least Concern (IUCN 3.1)

Scientific classification
- Kingdom: Animalia
- Phylum: Chordata
- Class: Mammalia
- Order: Chiroptera
- Family: Phyllostomidae
- Genus: Anoura
- Species: A. aequatoris

Binomial name
- Anoura aequatoris (Lönnberg, 1921)

Synonyms
- Anoura caudifer aequatoris Lönnberg, 1921

Species of bat

Anoura aequatoris (also known as the equatorial tailless bat) is a species of microbat that lives in South America in the countries of Bolivia, Colombia, Ecuador, and Peru.

== Taxonomy ==
When first described in 1921, Einar Lönnberg classified Anoura aequatoris as a subspecies of Anoura caudifer. In 2006, Mantilla-Meluk and Baker argued that there were enough differences between the two to elevate Anoura aequatoris to the level of distinct species. This conclusion, however, has been challenged. Some believe that it is not distinct enough to warrant separation from A. caudifera, and that further analysis is needed. A 2008 study challenged that elevating it to a species overstated the amount of diversity within the genus, and that it should remain a subspecies.

== Description ==
A. aequatoris can be differentiated from A. caudifer on the basis of its morphology, including its densely furred uropatagium that has a fringe of long hairs along its edge. Additionally, A. aequatoris is smaller, with a skull length of approximately 22.5 mm (0.89 in) and forearm lengths of 34.3–35.9 mm (1.35–1.41 in).

== Range and habitat ==
A. aequatoris is found in South America, where it has been documented in the following countries: Bolivia, Peru, Ecuador, and Colombia. It is found at high elevations from 600–1,500 m (2,000–4,900 ft) above sea level. It is associated with montane forests.
