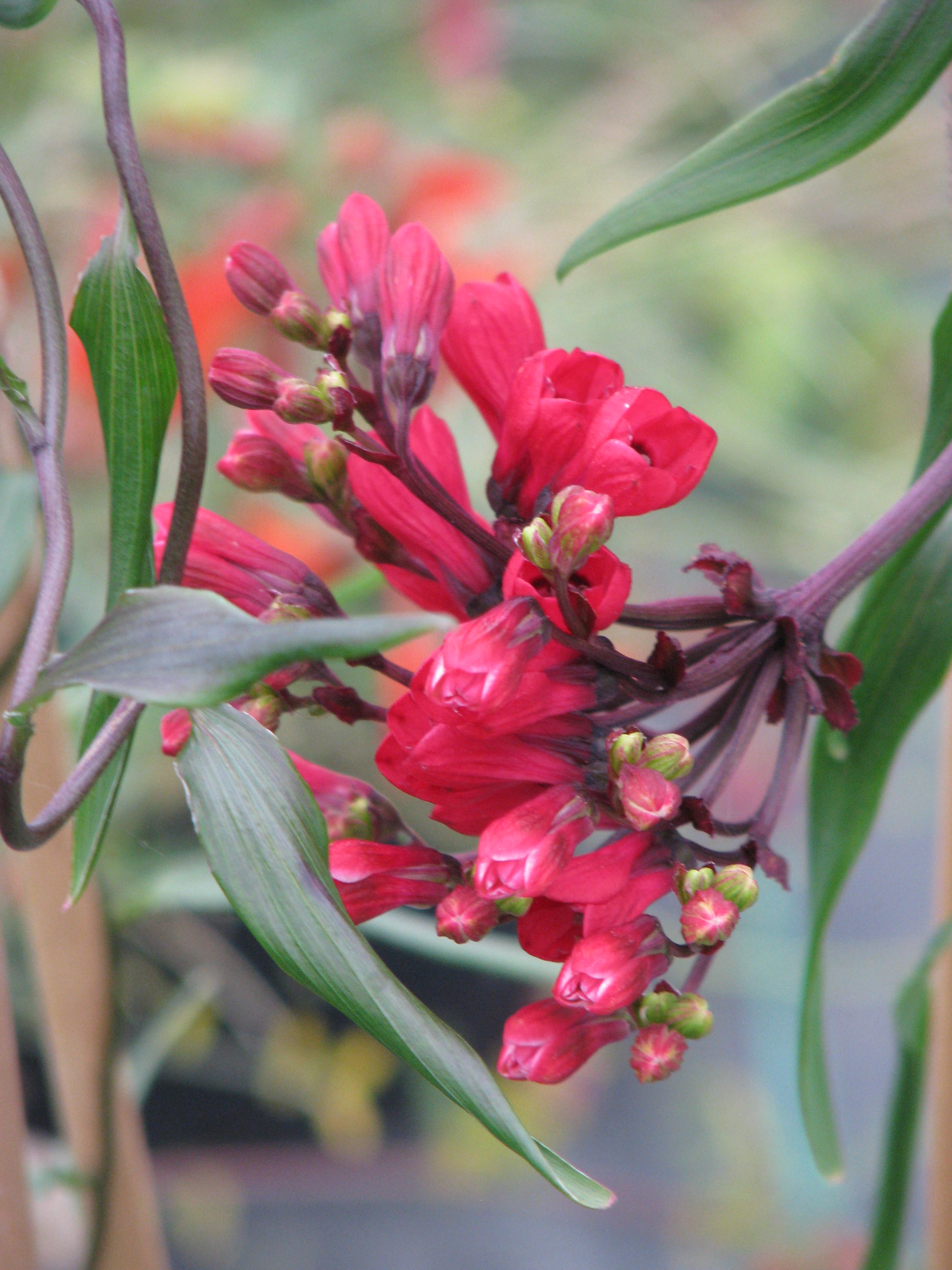
- Inflorescence

Scientific classification
- Kingdom: Plantae
- Clade: Tracheophytes
- Clade: Angiosperms
- Clade: Monocots
- Order: Liliales
- Family: Alstroemeriaceae
- Genus: Bomarea
- Species: B. salsilla

Binomial name
- Bomarea salsilla (L.) Mirb.

Synonyms
- List: Alstroemeria oculata G.Lodd.; Alstroemeria salsilla L.; Bomarea granatensis M.Roem.; Bomarea oculata (G.Lodd.) M.Roem.; Bomarea praecipua Herb.; Bomarea salsilla var. praecipua Herb.; Bomarea salsilla var. subfalcata Gay; Bomarea subfalcata Herb.

= Bomarea salsilla =

Species of flowering plant

Bomarea salsilla also known as Alstrœmeria salsilla or Rooted Alstrœmeria. Botanical print from the Curtis's Botanical Magazine, 1814. Copper engraving by F Sansom Junior from an illustration by Sydenham Teast Edwards.

Bomarea salsilla is a species of flowering plant in the family Alstroemeriaceae, native to Chile. It is distributed between the Valparaíso and Araucanía regions. It has gained the Royal Horticultural Society's Award of Garden Merit.
