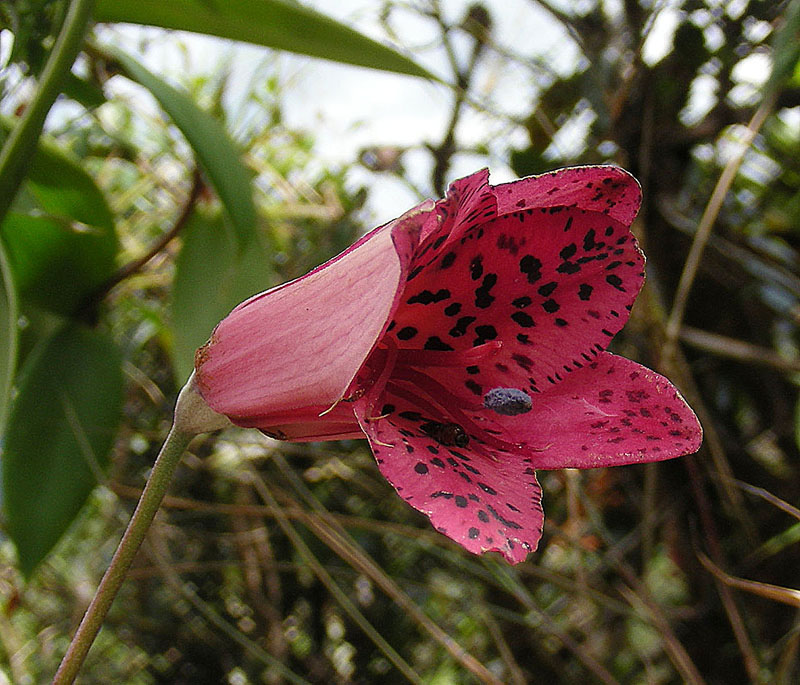

Conservation status
- Critically Endangered (IUCN 3.1)

Scientific classification
- Kingdom: Plantae
- Clade: Tracheophytes
- Clade: Angiosperms
- Clade: Monocots
- Order: Liliales
- Family: Alstroemeriaceae
- Genus: Bomarea
- Species: B. longipes

Binomial name
- Bomarea longipes Baker

= Bomarea longipes =

Species of plant

Bomarea longipes is a species of plant in the Alstroemeriaceae family. It is endemic to Peru and Ecuador. Its natural habitat is subtropical or tropical moist montane forests. It is threatened by habitat loss.
