= Bomarea graminifolia =

Conservation status
- Critically Endangered (IUCN 3.1)

Scientific classification
- Kingdom: Plantae
- Clade: Tracheophytes
- Clade: Angiosperms
- Clade: Monocots
- Order: Liliales
- Family: Alstroemeriaceae
- Genus: Bomarea
- Species: B. graminifolia

Binomial name
- Bomarea graminifolia Sodiro

Species of flowering plant

Bomarea graminifolia is a species of flowering plant in the family Alstroemeriaceae. It is endemic to Ecuador, where it has only been collected once, before 1908. The specimen probably came from the forests on the volcano Atacazo, near Quito.
