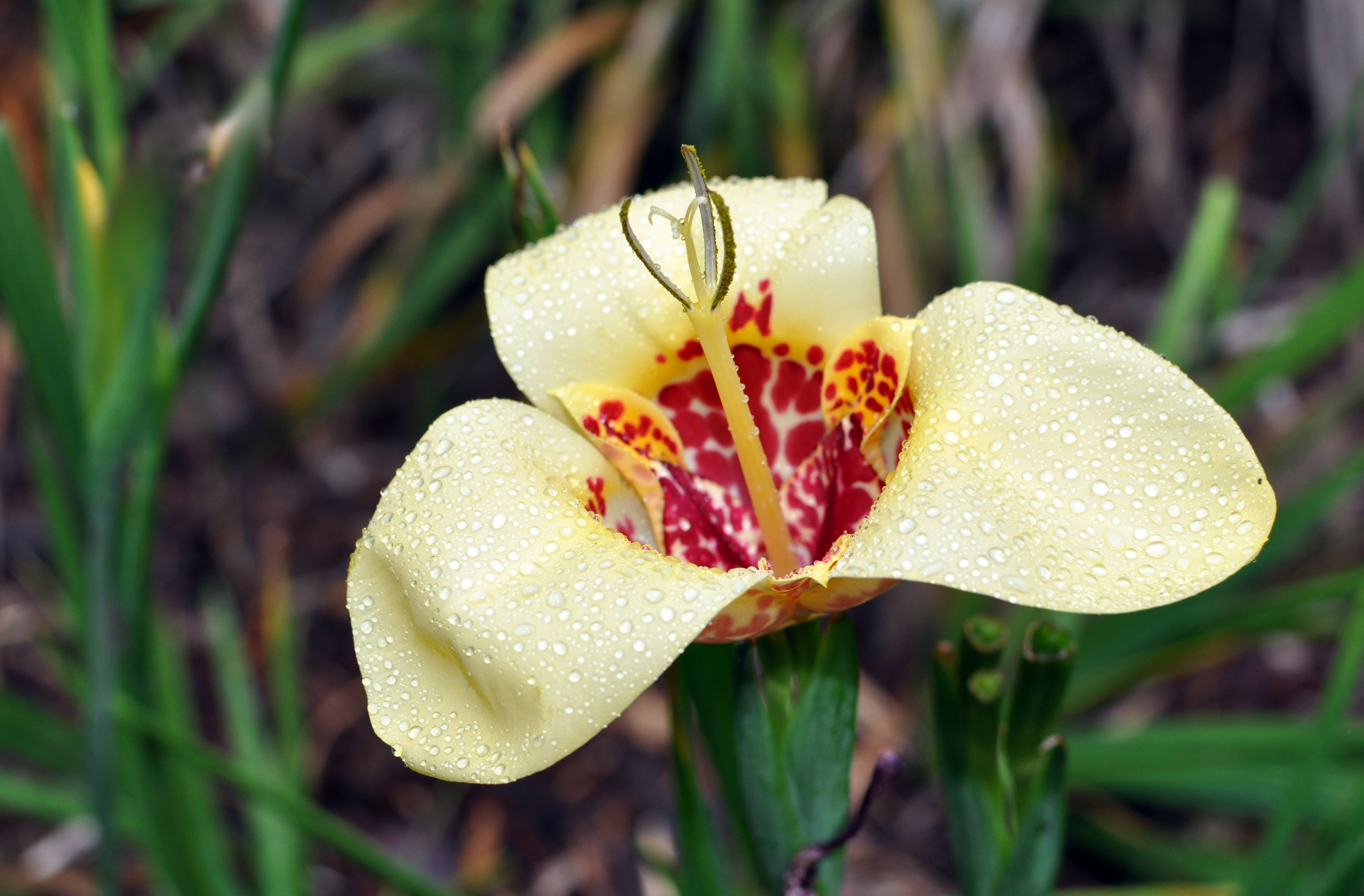
- Tigridia pavonia in Mexico

Scientific classification
- Kingdom: Plantae
- Clade: Tracheophytes
- Clade: Angiosperms
- Clade: Monocots
- Order: Asparagales
- Family: Iridaceae
- Subfamily: Iridoideae
- Tribe: Tigridieae
- Genus: Tigridia; Juss.

Type species
- Tigridia pavonia (L.f.) Redouté

Synonyms
- List: Ainea Ravenna in Bot. Not. 132: 467 (1979); Beatonia Herb. in Bot. Mag. 66: t. 3779 (1840); Cardiostigma Baker in J. Linn. Soc., Bot. 16: 102 (1877); Colima (Ravenna) Aarón Rodr. & Ortiz-Cat. in Acta Bot. Mex. 65: 53 (2003); Fosteria Molseed in Brittonia 20: 232 (1968); Hydrotaenia Lindl. in Edwards's Bot. Reg. 24(Misc.): 69 (1838); Pardinia Herb. in Edwards's Bot. Reg. 30(Misc.): 66 (1844); Rigidella Lindl. in Edwards's Bot. Reg. 26: t. 16 (1840); Sessilanthera Molseed & Cruden in Brittonia 21: 191 (1969)

= Tigridia =

Genus of flowering plants

Tigridia /taɪˈɡrɪdiə/, is a genus of bulbous or cormous flowering plants belonging to the family Iridaceae. With common names including peacock flowers, tiger flowers, jaguar flowers, or shell flowers, they have large showy flowers; and one species, Tigridia pavonia, is often cultivated for this. The approximately 60 species in this family grow in the Americas, from Mexico down to Chile.

The tigridia flower is short lived, each often blooming for only one day, but often several flowers will bloom from the same stalk. Usually they are dormant during the winter dry-season. The roots are edible and were eaten by the Aztecs of Mexico who called it cacomitl, and its flower ocēlōxōchitl meaning "jaguar flower".

It was first published by French botanist Antoine Laurent de Jussieu in his book Genera plantarum on page 57 in 1789.

The genus name Tigridia means "tiger-like", and alludes to the coloration and spotting of the flowers of the type species Tigridia pavonia.

== Species ==
There are 60 species accepted by Plants of the World Online;

- Tigridia albicans Ravenna - Tacna Province in Peru
- Tigridia alpestris Molseed - Mexico
- Tigridia amatlanensis Aarón Rodr. & García-Mend - Oaxaca
- Tigridia arequipensis Montesinos, A.Pauca & Revilla
- Tigridia augusta Drapiez - central + southern Mexico
- Tigridia azufresensis López-Pérez & Munguía-Lino
- Tigridia bicolor Molseed - Oaxaca
- Tigridia catarinensis Cruden - San Luis Potosí
- Tigridia chiapensis Molseed ex Cruden - Chiapas
- Tigridia chrysantha Cruden & S.J.Walker ex McVaugh - Jalisco
- Tigridia citrina (Cruden) Goldblatt
- Tigridia coerulea Goldblatt
- Tigridia convoluta (Ravenna) Goldblatt - Oaxaca
- Tigridia conzattii (R.C.Foster) Goldblatt - Oaxaca
- Tigridia dugesii S.Watson - Jalisco
- Tigridia durangensis Molseed ex Cruden - Durango
- Tigridia ehrenbergii (Schltdl.) Molseed - Mexico
- Tigridia estelae López-Ferr. & Espejo - Durango
- Tigridia flammea (Lindl.) Ravenna - Michoacán
- Tigridia fosteri Goldblatt
- Tigridia galanthoides Molseed - southern Mexico
- Tigridia gracielae Aarón Rodr. & Ortiz-Cat. - México State
- Tigridia hallbergii Molseed - central + southern Mexico, Guatemala
- Tigridia heliantha (Ravenna) Goldblatt
- Tigridia hintonii Molseed - Guerrero
- Tigridia huajuapanensis Molseed ex Cruden - Oaxaca
- Tigridia huyanae (J.F.Macbr.) Ravenna - Lima Province in Peru
- Tigridia immaculata (Herb.) Ravenna - Oaxaca, Chiapas, Guatemala
- Tigridia inusitata (Cruden) Ravenna - Guerrero
- Tigridia latifolia (Weath.) Goldblatt
- Tigridia longispatha (Herb.) Goldblatt
- Tigridia lutea Link, Klotzsch & Otto - Lima and Ancash provinces of Peru
- Tigridia mariaetrinitatis Espejo & López-Ferr. - Oaxaca
- Tigridia martinezii Calderón - Hidalgo
- Tigridia matudae Molseed - México State
- Tigridia meleagris (Lindl.) G.Nicholson - central + southern Mexico, Guatemala
- Tigridia mexicana Molseed - central + southern Mexico
- Tigridia minuta Ravenna - Apurímac + Ayacucho Provinces in Peru
- Tigridia molseediana Ravenna - Oaxaca, Guatemala
- Tigridia mortonii Molseed - México State
- Tigridia multiflora (Baker) Ravenna - central + southern Mexico
- Tigridia nanchititlensis Aarón Rodr. & Szeszko
- Tigridia oaxacana (Molseed) Goldblatt - Oaxaca
- Tigridia orthantha (Lem.) Ravenna - Oaxaca, Chiapas, Guatemala
- Tigridia pavonia (L.f.) Redouté - Mexico, Guatemala, El Salvador, Honduras
- Tigridia pearcei (Baker) Ravenna - Huánuco region in Peru
- Tigridia philippiana I.M.Johnst. - Tarapacá + Antofagasta Provinces in Chile
- Tigridia potosina López-Ferr. & Espejo - San Luis Potosí
- Tigridia pugana Aarón Rodr. & Ortiz-Cat. - Jalisco
- Tigridia pulchella B.L.Rob. - Jalisco, Michoacán
- Tigridia purpusii Molseed - Puebla and northern Oaxaca
- Tigridia purruchucana (Herb.) Ravenna - Lima Province in Peru
- Tigridia raimondii Ravenna - Arequipa Province in Peru
- Tigridia rzedowskiana Aarón Rodr. & Ortiz-Cat. - Querétaro
- Tigridia seleriana (Loes.) Ravenna - Oaxaca, Chiapas, Guatemala
- Tigridia suarezii Aarón Rodr. & Ortiz-Cat. - Jalisco
- Tigridia tepoxtlana Ravenna - Morelos
- Tigridia tuitensis (Aarón Rodr. & Ortiz-Cat.) Goldblatt
- Tigridia vanhouttei(Baker) Espejo & López-Ferr - central + northeastern Mexico
- Tigridia venusta Cruden - Michoacán

== Hybrids ==
Several hybrids exist, including; Tigridia × mathewii J.M.H.Shaw, first published in Phytoneuron 2015-53: 4 in 2015. It is an artificial hybrid, a cross of T. orthantha × T. pavonia.

== Distribution ==
They are native to the countries (and regions) of; northern Chile, El Salvador, Guatemala, Honduras, Mexico and Peru.

They have been introduced into: Bolivia, Colombia, Ecuador and Madeira.

== Other sources ==
- Rodriguez, A. and K. Sytsma. 2006. Phylogeny of the "Tiger-flower" group (Tigrideae: Iridaceae): Molecular and morphological evidence. Pp. 412–424, in J.T. Columbus, E.A. Friar, J.M. Porter, L.M. Prince and M.G. Simpson (eds.). Monocots: Comparative Biology and Evolution, Vol. 1. Rancho Santa Ana Botanic Garden, Claremont.
