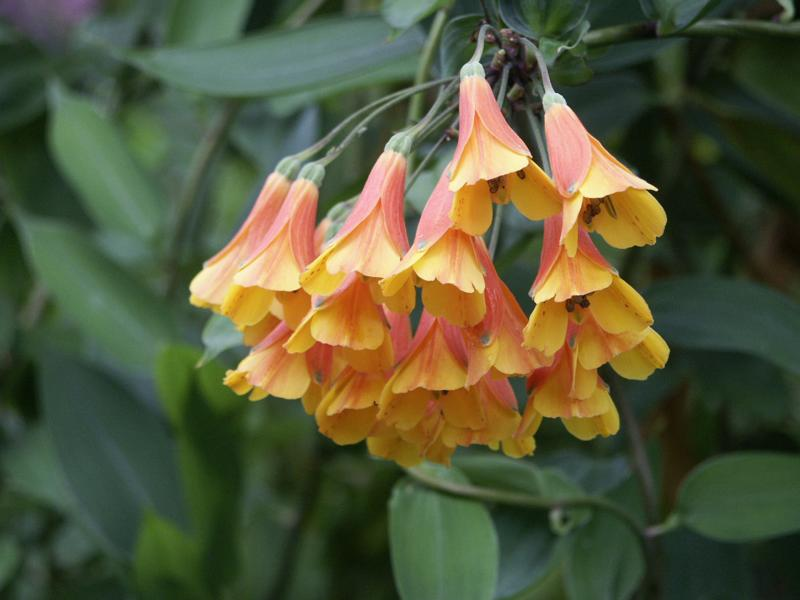

Scientific classification
- Kingdom: Plantae
- Clade: Tracheophytes
- Clade: Angiosperms
- Clade: Monocots
- Order: Liliales
- Family: Alstroemeriaceae
- Genus: Bomarea
- Species: B. multiflora

Binomial name
- Bomarea multiflora (L. f.) Mirb.

Synonyms
- Alstroemeria multiflora L.f.; Alstroemeria caldasii Kunth; Alstroemeria floribunda Kunth; Alstroemeria bredemeyeriana Willd. ex Schult. & Schult.f.; Bomarea caldasiana Herb.; Bomarea caldasii (Kunth) Herb.; Bomarea floribunda (Kunth) Herb.; Bomarea halliana Herb.; Bomarea turneriana Herb.; Bomarea oligantha Baker; Bomarea frondea Mast.; Alstroemeria caldasiana (Herb.) Hemsl.; Bomarea vestita Baker; Bomarea ambigua Sodiro; Bomarea borjae Sodiro; Bomarea microcephala Sodiro; Bomarea rigidifolia Sodiro; Bomarea foliolosa Kraenzl; Bomarea vegasana Killip

= Bomarea multiflora =

Species of flowering plant

Bomarea multiflora, the trailing lily, is a species of flowering plant in the alstroemeria family. It is a multi-stemmed vine native to Colombia and Ecuador.

It is an invasive plant species in New Zealand and is listed on the National Pest Plant Accord.

It can be grown outdoors in a sheltered spot in temperate zones, but does not tolerate being frozen. Alternatively it can be grown under glass. In cultivation in the UK it has won the Royal Horticultural Society's Award of Garden Merit.

== See also ==
- List of plants known as lily
