= Handley's tailless bat =

- Stuffed specimen

Conservation status
- Least Concern (IUCN 3.1)

Scientific classification
- Kingdom: Animalia
- Phylum: Chordata
- Class: Mammalia
- Order: Chiroptera
- Family: Phyllostomidae
- Genus: Anoura
- Species: A. cultrata

Binomial name
- Anoura cultrata Handley, 1960
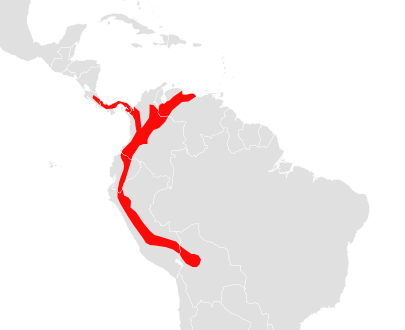
- Handley's tailless bat range

Synonyms
- Anoura brevirostrum Anoura werckleae

Species of bat

Handley's tailless bat (Anoura cultrata) is a species of bat in the family Phyllostomidae. It is found in Bolivia, Colombia, Costa Rica, Ecuador, Panama, Peru, and Venezuela.
