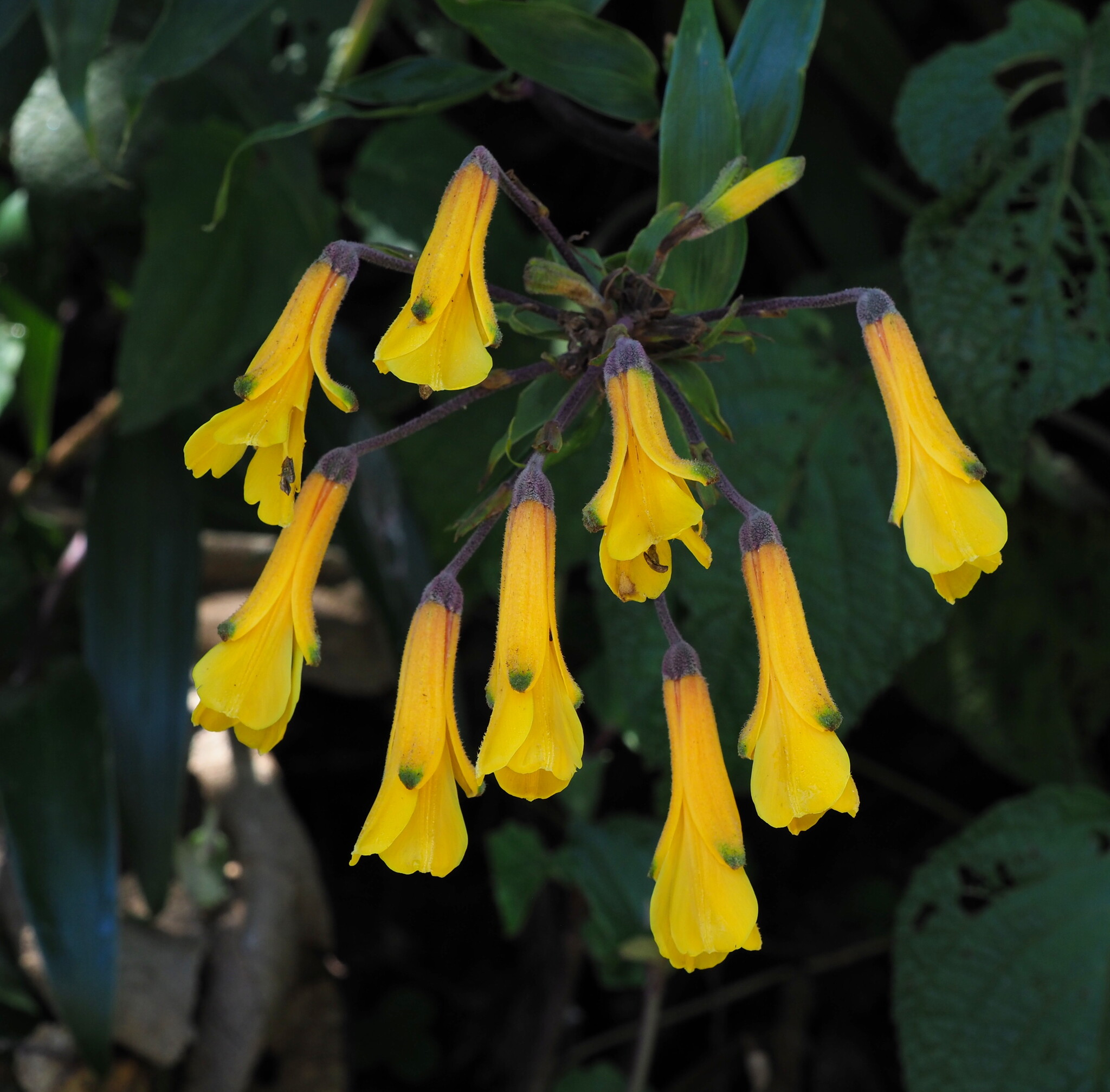

Conservation status
- Vulnerable (IUCN 3.1)

Scientific classification
- Kingdom: Plantae
- Clade: Embryophytes
- Clade: Tracheophytes
- Clade: Angiosperms
- Clade: Monocots
- Order: Liliales
- Family: Alstroemeriaceae
- Genus: Bomarea
- Species: B. lutea

Binomial name
- Bomarea lutea Herb.

Synonyms
- Bomarea angamarcana Sodiro; Bomarea lutea var. polyantha Pab; Bomarea saloyana Sodiro

= Bomarea lutea =

Species of flowering plant

Bomarea lutea is a species of flowering plant in the family Alstroemeriaceae. It is endemic to Ecuador. Its natural habitat is subtropical or tropical moist montane forests. It is threatened by habitat loss.
