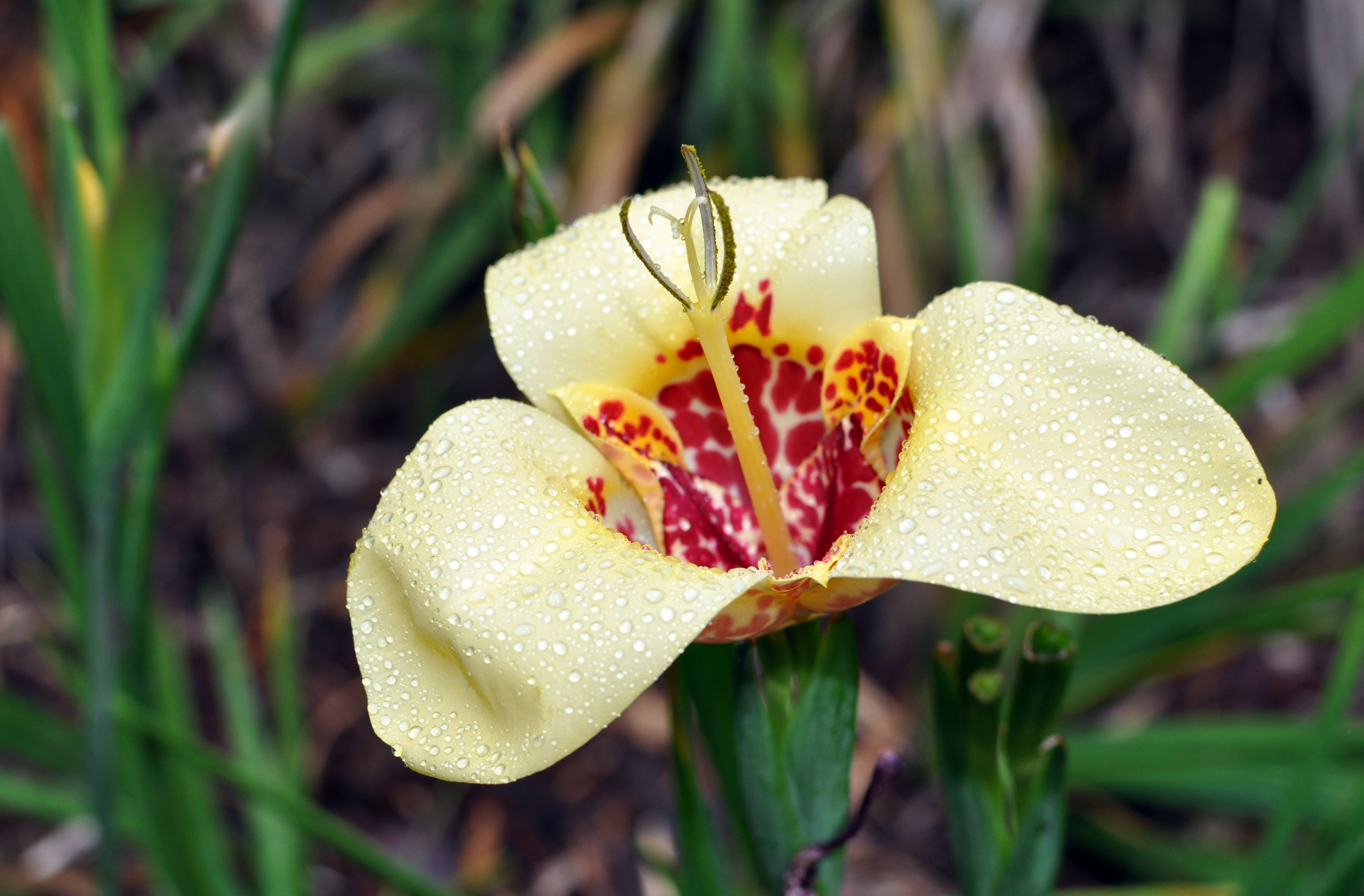
- A yellow-flowered form

Scientific classification
- Kingdom: Plantae
- Clade: Tracheophytes
- Clade: Angiosperms
- Clade: Monocots
- Order: Asparagales
- Family: Iridaceae
- Genus: Tigridia
- Species: T. pavonia

Binomial name
- Tigridia pavonia (L.f.) Redouté

Synonyms
- List: Beatonia grandiflora (Cav.) Klatt; Beatonia lutea (Link, Klotzsch & Otto) Klatt; Ferraria pavonia L.f.; Ferraria tigridia Sims nom. illeg.; Marica tigridia (Sims) Lehm. nom. illeg.; Moraea grandiflora (Cav.) Pers.; Moraea pavonia (L.f.) Thunb.; Moraea tigridia (Sims) Baker; Sisyrinchium grandiflorum Cav.; Sisyrinchium palmifolium Sessé & Moc. nom. illeg.; Tigridia conchiflora Sweet; Tigridia grandiflora (Cav.) Diels nom. illeg.; Tigridia grandiflora Salisb. nom. illeg.; Tigridia lutea Link, Klotzsch & Otto; Tigridia oxypetala R.Morris; Tigridia pringlei S.Watson; Tigridia speciosa Poit.; Vieusseuxia pavonia (L.f.) DC.

= Tigridia pavonia =

Species of plant in the iris family

Tigridia pavonia is a species of flowering plant in the iris family Iridaceae. Common names include jockey's cap lily, Mexican shellflower, peacock flower, jaguar flower, tiger iris, and tiger flower. The Aztecs of Mexico called the flower ocēlōxōchitl meaning "jaguar flower". The Inga and Kamëntšá peoples of Colombia refer to this flower as watsimba. This summer-flowering bulbous herbaceous perennial is widespread across much of Colombia, El Salvador, Guatemala, Honduras, and Mexico. It is naturalized in Ecuador and Peru.

The leaves are narrow and lance-shaped. The three-petalled blooms occur in a variety of colour combinations with strongly contrasting central markings. The three sepals are larger, to 7.5 cm (3.0 in) long, giving the flower a total width of 15 cm (5.9 in). They open early in the morning and close before dusk. Blooms are successional throughout summer. Plants bloom in the first year after sowing.

Tigridia pavonia is cultivated as an ornamental plant. It prefers a sheltered position in full sun, in sandy but fertile soil. The plants are said to be hardy to as low as −12 °C (10 °F) in many sources, while in some others only to 5 °C (41 °F). Most authorities recommend that the corms should be lifted and stored throughout the winter months in colder areas.

The roasted bulbs are edible and have been used by the American Indians and Indigenous peoples of Mexico. It has a chestnut-like flavour.

The Indigenous communities of Colombia's Sibundoy Valley, the Inga and Kamëntšá, know the flower as watsimba and use its bulbs in a variety of recipes. Indigenous women in the valley also use Tigridia pavonia bulbs to produce reddish dyes for makeup and clothes. It is used extensively as chicken feed, and is considered by these communities to produce better meat and eggs than other feeds. When used for culinary purposes, watsimba is also considered a substitute for potatoes. Tigridia pavonia is considered a good source of food security in these communities' chagras (Indigenous polyculture gardens), given that if other staple crops fail to produce well, one can eat the flower bulbs. The Indigenous communities of the Sibundoy Valley also use the flowers for medicinal purposes in a variety of infusions and poultices, particularly for acid reflux, gastritis, and abdominal distension.

The aphid Aphis newtoni may be found on this plant.

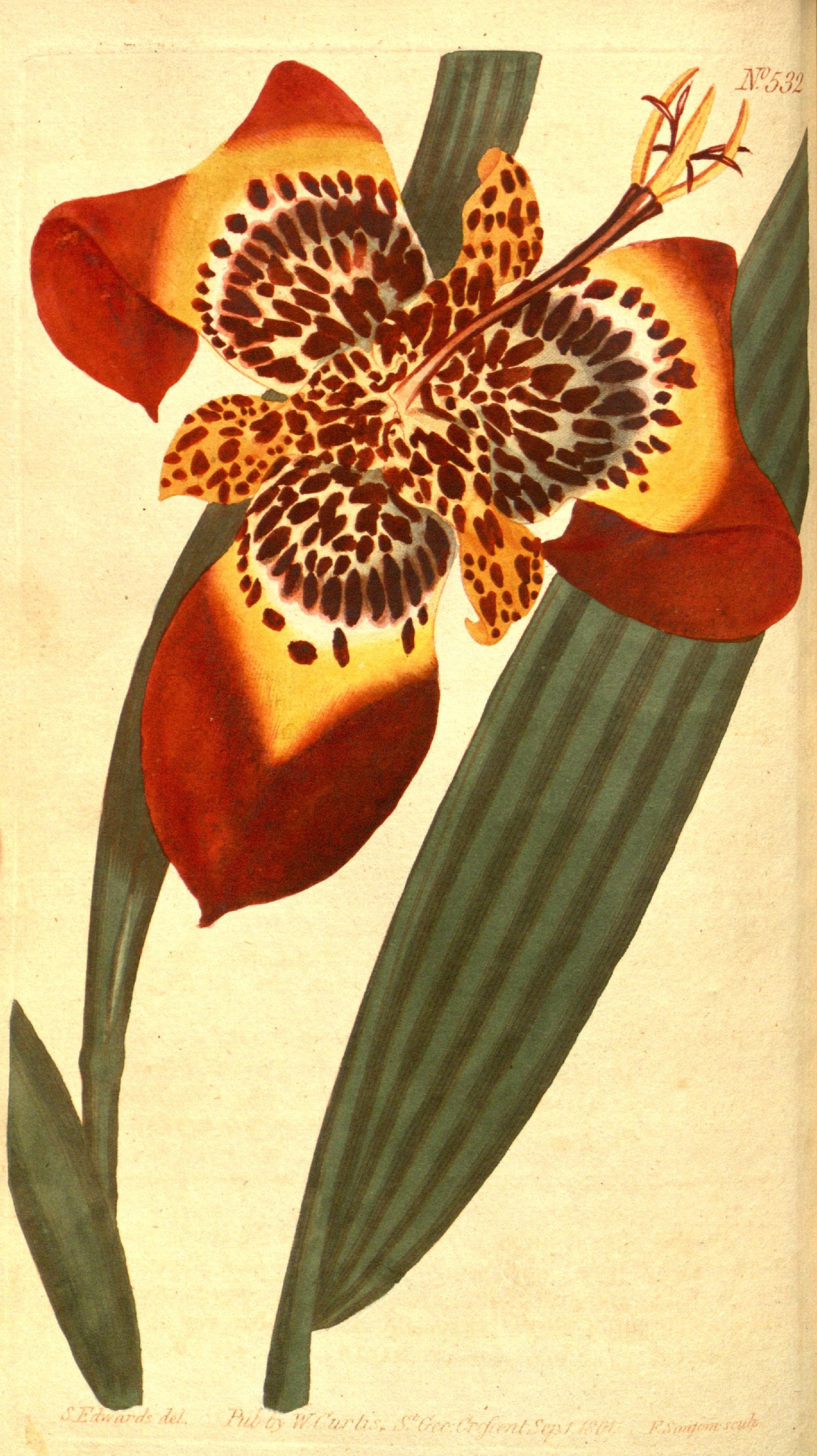

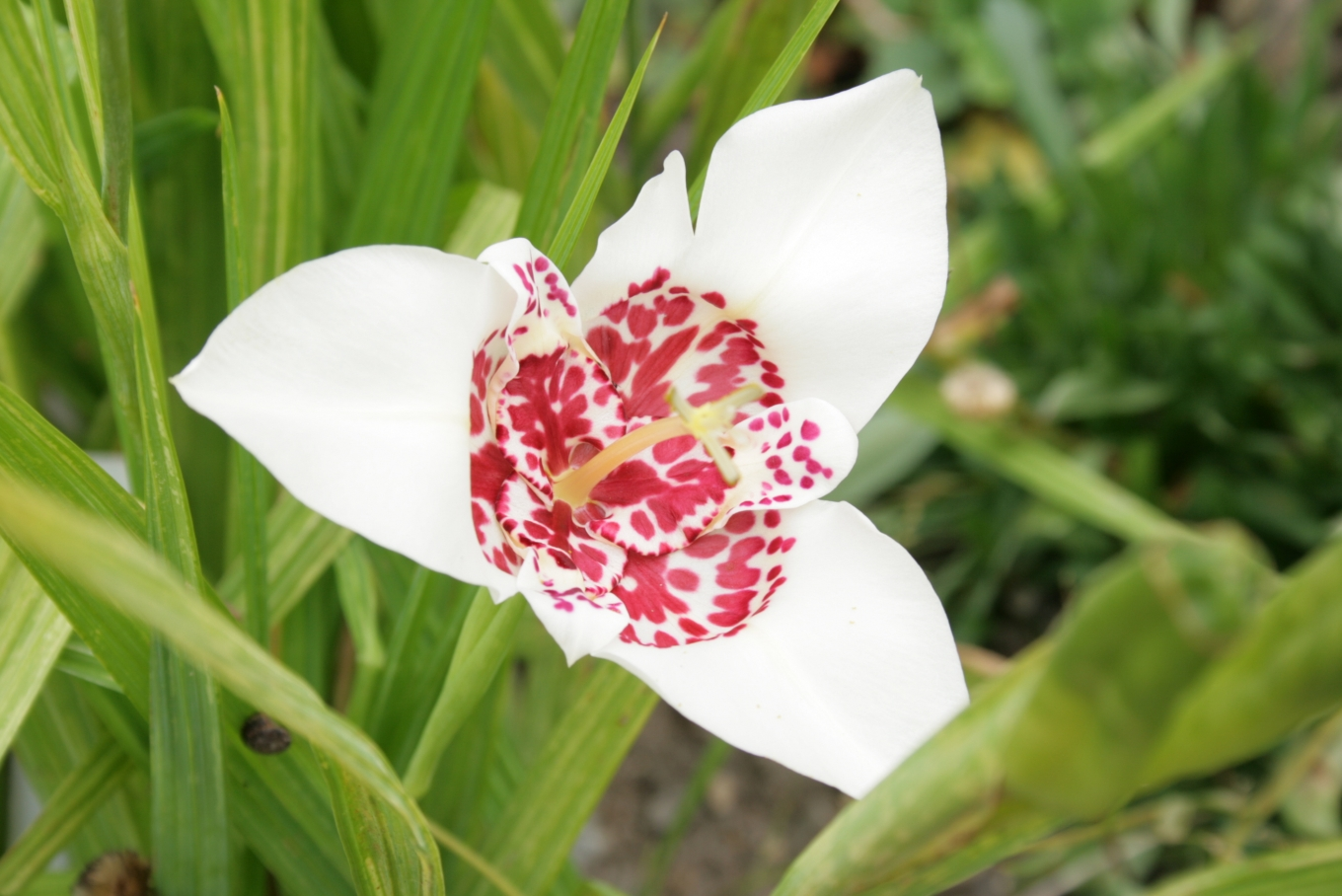

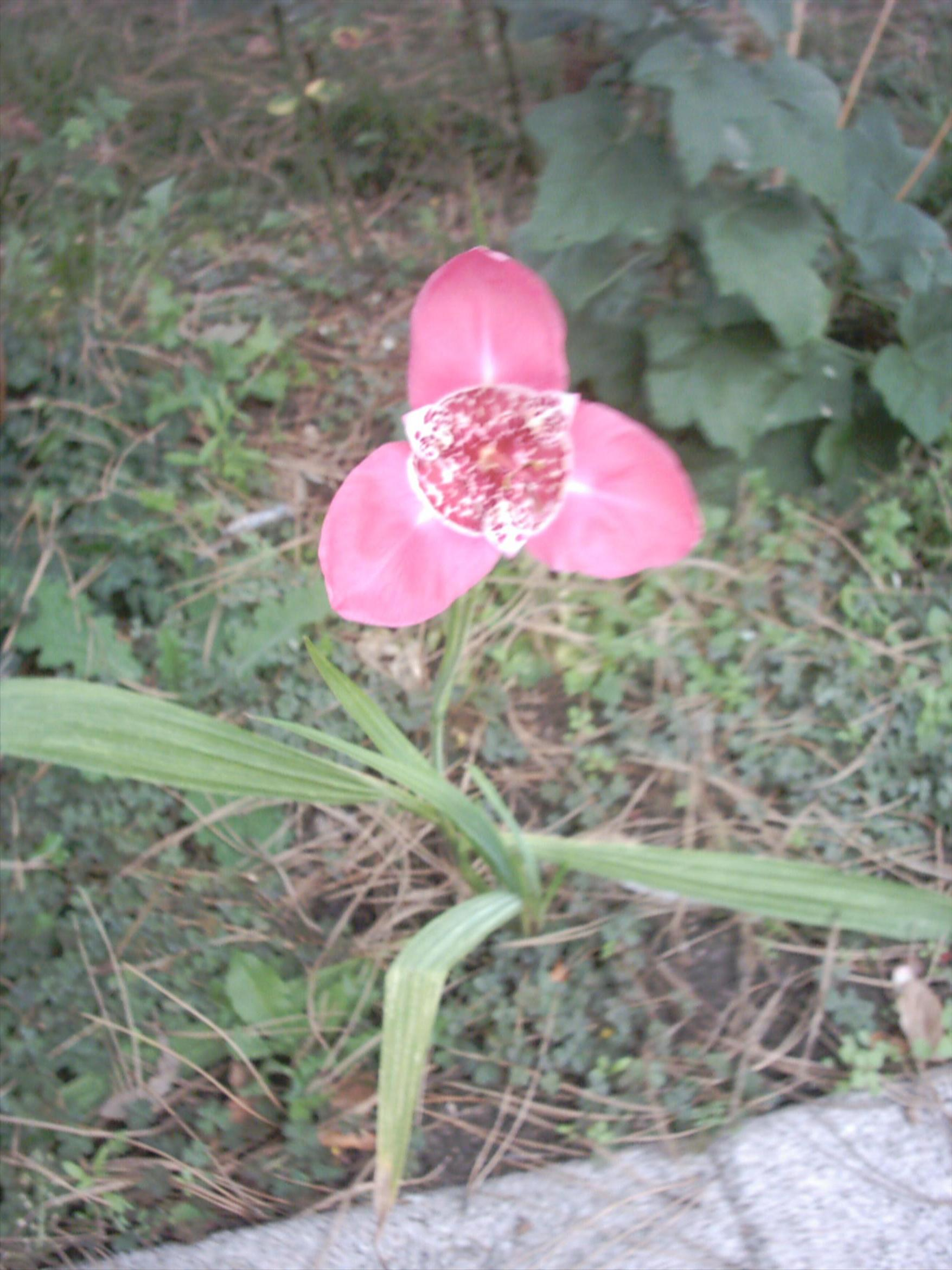

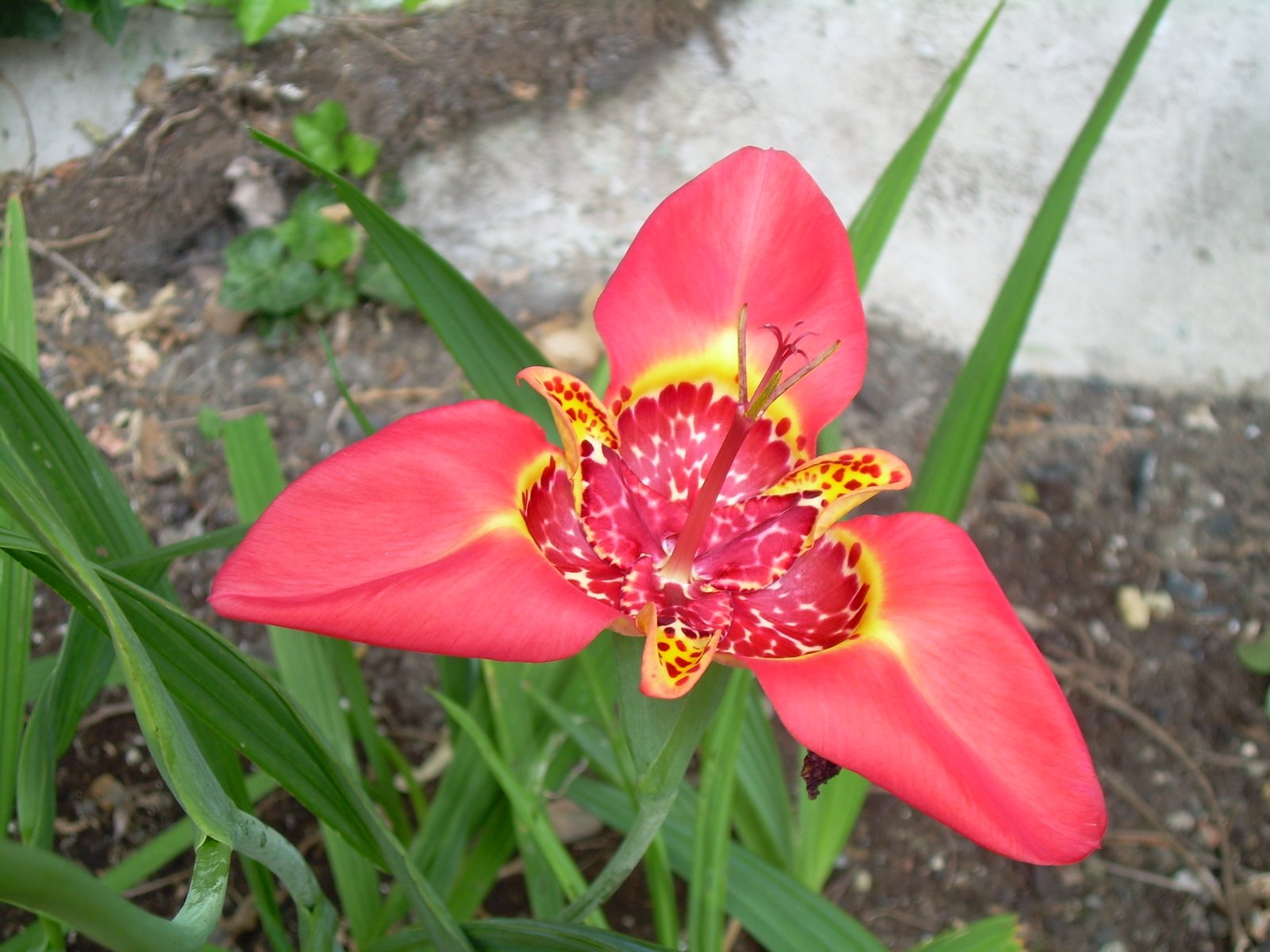
