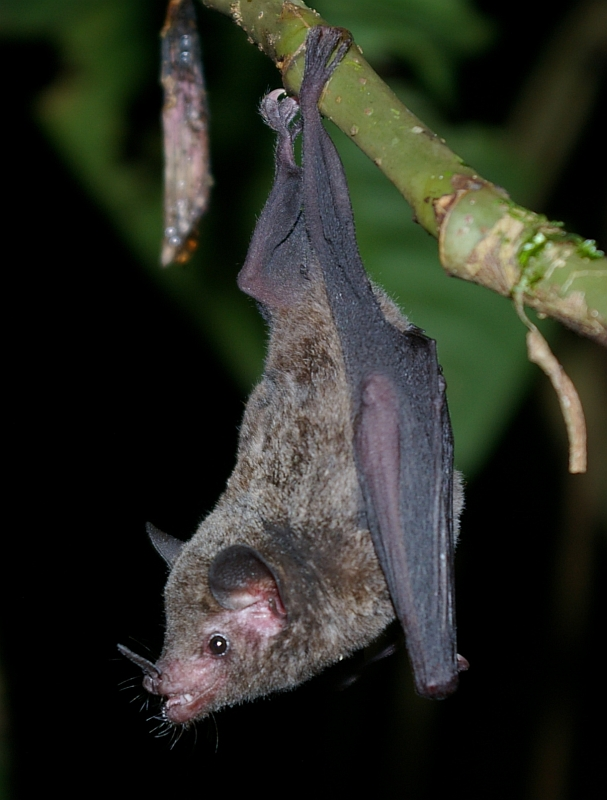
- Commissaris's long-tongued bat (Glossophaga commissarisi)

Scientific classification
- Kingdom: Animalia
- Phylum: Chordata
- Class: Mammalia
- Order: Chiroptera
- Family: Phyllostomidae
- Subfamily: Glossophaginae
- Genus: Glossophaga; E. Geoffroy, 1818

Type species
- Vespertilio soricinus Pallas, 1766

Species
- G. commissarisi G. leachii G. longirostris G. morenoi G. soricina

= Glossophaga =

Genus of bats

Glossophaga (long-tongued bat) is a genus of bats in the leaf-nosed bat family, Phyllostomidae. Members of the genus are native to the American Neotropics.

== Species ==
- G. antillarum (Rehn, 1902): Jamaican long-tongued bat, Jamaica.
- G. bakeri (Webster & J. K. Jones, 1987): Baker's long-tongued bat, South America.
- G. commissarisi (Gardner, 1962): Commissaris's long-tongued bat - Central and South America.
- G. leachii (Gray, 1844): gray long-tongued bat - Mexico, Central America.
- G. longirostris (Miller, 1898): Miller's long-tongued bat - Northern South America, Windward Islands.
- G. morenoi (Martinez & Villa, 1938): western long-tongued bat - Mexico.
- G. mutica (Merriam, 1898): Merriam's long-tongued bat, Mexico, Central America, northern South America
- G. soricina (Pallas, 1766): Pallas's long-tongued bat - Central and South America.
- G. valens (Miller, 1913): Ecuadorian long-tongued bat - Ecuador and Peru.
