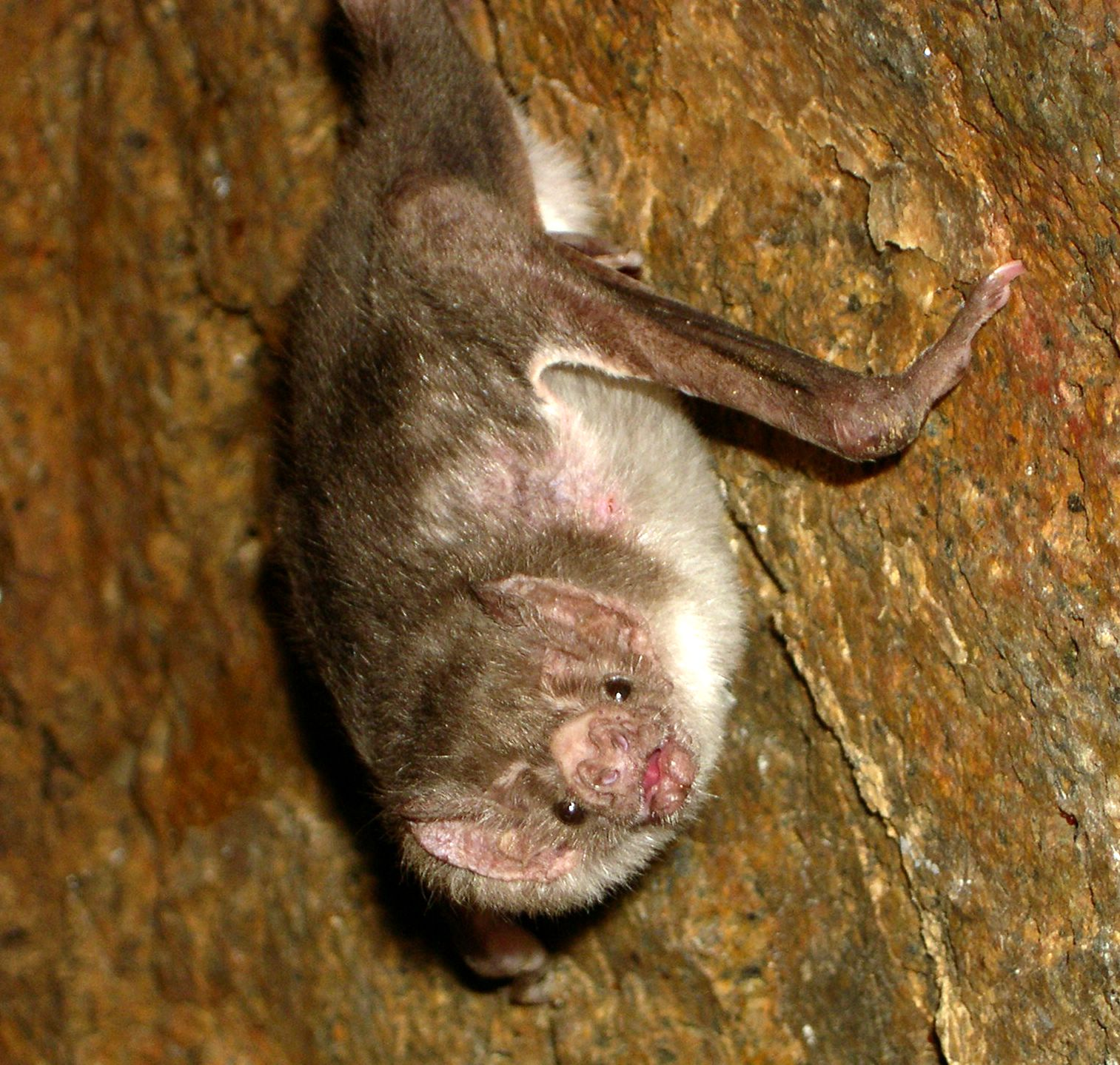
- Common vampire bat (Desmodus rotundus)

Scientific classification
- Kingdom: Animalia
- Phylum: Chordata
- Class: Mammalia
- Order: Chiroptera
- Family: Phyllostomidae
- Subfamily: Desmodontinae
- Genus: Desmodus; Wied-Neuwied, 1826

Type species
- Desmodus rufus Wied-Neuwied, 1826

Species
- Desmodus archaeodaptes† Desmodus draculae† Desmodus rotundus Desmodus stocki†

= Desmodus =

Genus of bats

Desmodus is a genus of bats which—along with the genera Diaemus and Diphylla—are allied as the subfamily Desmodontinae, the carnivorous, blood-consuming vampire bats of the New World leaf-nosed bat family Phyllostomidae.

The genus was erected in 1826 to accommodate a new species Desmodus rufus described by Maximilian Wied in the second volume of his work detailing his explorations in Brazil. The type species was previously described with the name Phyllostoma rotundus by Étienne Geoffroy in 1810.

- subfamilia Desmodontinae

- genus Desmodus

- †Desmodus archaeodaptes, extinct,
- †Desmodus draculae – giant vampire bat, extinct,
- Desmodus rotundus – common vampire bat, extant,

- †Desmodus rotundus puntajudensis (Desmodus puntajudensis) - Cuban vampire bat, extinct,

- †Desmodus stocki – Stock's vampire bat, extinct.
