= Thermoception =

Sensation and perception of temperature

In physiology, thermoception or thermoreception is the sensation and perception of temperature, or more accurately, temperature differences inferred from heat flux. It deals with a series of events and processes required for an organism to receive a temperature stimulus, convert it to a molecular signal, and recognize and characterize the signal in order to trigger an appropriate response. Thermal stimuli may be noxious (posing a threat to the subject) or innocuous (no threat). The temperature sensitive proteins in thermoreceptors may also be activated by menthol or capsaicin, hence why these molecules evoke cooling and burning sensations, respectively.

A thermoreceptor may absorb heat via conduction, convection or radiation. However, the type of heat transfer is usually irrelevant to the functioning of a thermoceptor. Transient receptor potential channels (TRP channels) (Note: The TRPV1 and TRPM8 receptors play key roles in the perception of heat and cold.) are believed to play a role in many species in sensation of hot, cold, and pain. Vertebrates have at least two types of thermoreceptors: those that detect heat and those that detect cold.

== Heat transfer ==
Thermoception depends on the transfer of heat from the environment to the thermoreceptor. The transfer may be conductive, convective or radiative, but the method is irrelevant to the thermoceptor, which simply detects its own temperature, not that of the environment. The temperature of a thermoreceptor is the result of an energy balance between the heat flux from the environment and the heat dissipation to the rest of the body (or vice versa for cold detection). For example, a low-temperature metal, with high thermal conductivity may feel warmer than a high-temperature ceramic, with low thermal conductivity, because touching the metal results in a higher temperature of the thermoreceptor itself.

== Thermoreceptors ==
A thermoreceptor is a non-specialised sense receptor, or more accurately the receptive portion of a sensory neuron, that detects absolute and relative changes in temperature In mammals, temperature receptors innervate various tissues including the skin (as cutaneous receptors), cornea and urinary bladder. In warm receptors, warming results in an increase in their action potential discharge rate, while cooling results in a decrease in discharge rate. In cold receptors, their firing rate increases during cooling and decreases during warming.

=== Molecular basis ===
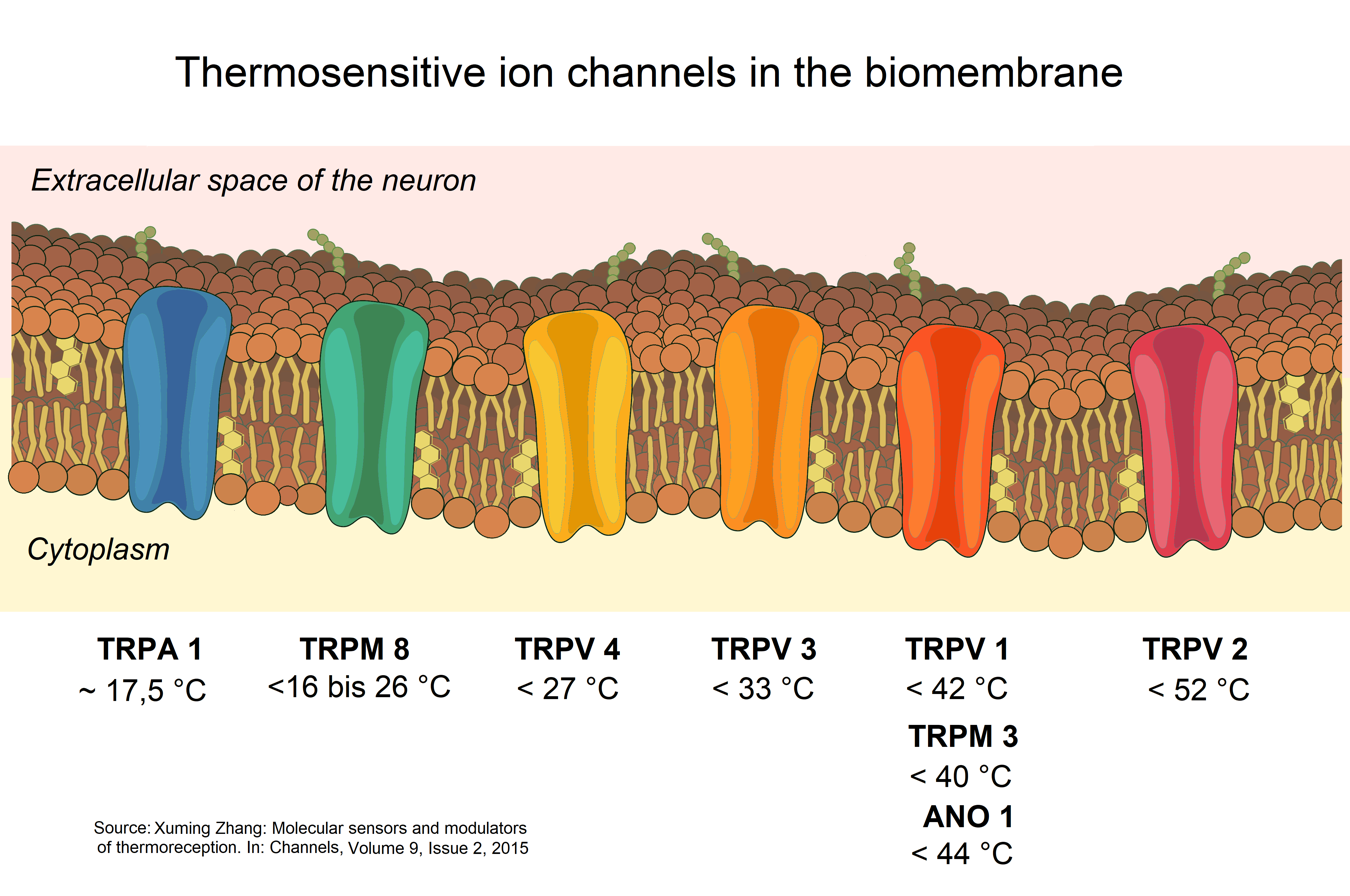
Channels shown: TRPA1, TRPM8, TRPV4, TRPV3, TRPV1, TRPM3, ANO1, TRPV2

This area of research has recently received considerable attention with the identification and cloning of the Transient Receptor Potential (TRP) family of proteins. A number of ion channels are responsible for thermoception and activate at various temperatures so are therefore responsible for different types of thermal stimuli. TRPV1 is the primary channel associated with noxious heat sensing, as well as the detection of capsaicin. Innocuous warm sensation is mediated by activation of TRPM2. Innocuous cool sensation is mediated by activation of TRPM8. TRPA1 is sometimes sensitive to menthol and considered to be related to noxious cool sensation, but the mechanism is unclear.

The Nobel Prize in Physiology or Medicine in 2021 was attributed to David Julius (professor at the University of California, San Francisco, US) and Ardem Patapoutian (neuroscience professor at Scripps Research in La Jolla, California, US) "for their discovery of receptors for temperature and touch".

== In humans ==
In humans, temperature sensation from thermoreceptors enters the spinal cord along the axons of Lissauer's tract that synapse on second order neurons in grey matter of the dorsal horn. The axons of these second order neurons then decussate, joining the spinothalamic tract as they ascend to neurons in the ventral posterolateral nucleus of the thalamus. A study in 2017 shows that the thermosensory information passes to the lateral parabrachial nucleus rather than to the thalamus and this drives thermoregulatory behaviour. Thermoreceptors in humans are able to detect temperature changes as small as .38°C, but the sensitivity decreases with ambient temperatures higher and lower than 24°C. Even the smallest changes are linked to change in social behaviour, like a need for increased interpersonal space.

== Thermal vision ==
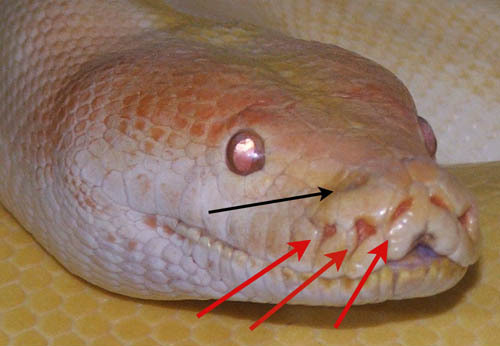
Positions of the pit organs (arrowed in red) on a python, relative to its nostril (black arrow)

Thermal vision is the ability to detect heat through radiative means. Vision specifically denotes the ability to not only detect heat but also form an image with that information. However, given the lack of knowledge or uncertainty of how an organism may interpret their thermoreceptor signals, any organism with organs specifically evolved for radiative thermoception are generally classed as thermal vision.

=== In snakes ===
Crotalinae (pit viper) and Boidae (boa) snakes can effectively see the infrared radiation emitted by hot objects. The snakes' face has a pair of holes, or pits, lined with temperature sensors. The sensors indirectly detect infrared radiation by its heating effect on the skin inside the pit. They can work out which part of the pit is hottest, and therefore the direction of the heat source, which could be a warm-blooded prey animal. By combining information from both pits, the snake can also estimate the distance of the object.

=== In vampire bats ===
The Common vampire bat has specialized infrared sensors in its nose-leaf. Vampire bats are the only mammals that feed exclusively on blood. The infrared sense enables Desmodus to localize homeothermic (warm-blooded) animals (cattle, horses, wild mammals) within a range of about 10 to 15 cm. This infrared perception is possibly used in detecting regions of maximal blood flow on targeted prey.

=== In other mammals ===
Dogs, like vampire bats, can detect weak thermal radiation with their rhinaria (noses).

On February 14, 2013 researchers developed a neural implant that gives rats the ability to sense infrared light which for the first time provides living creatures with new abilities, instead of simply replacing or augmenting existing abilities.

=== In invertebrates ===
Other animals with specialized heat detectors are forest fire seeking beetles (Melanophila acuminata), which lay their eggs in conifers freshly killed by forest fires. Darkly pigmented butterflies Pachliopta aristolochiae and Troides rhadamantus use specialized heat detectors to avoid damage while basking. The blood sucking bugs Triatoma infestans may also have a specialised thermoception organ.

== See also ==
- Infrared sensing in snakes
- Infrared sensing in vampire bats
- List of Nobel laureates in Physiology or Medicine#Laureates
- Electroreception – Biological electricity-related abilities
- Mechanoreceptor – Sensory receptor cell responding to mechanical pressure or strain
- Nociception – How an organism receives and responds to painful stimuli
- Proprioception – Sense of self-movement, force, and body position
- Thermoregulation
