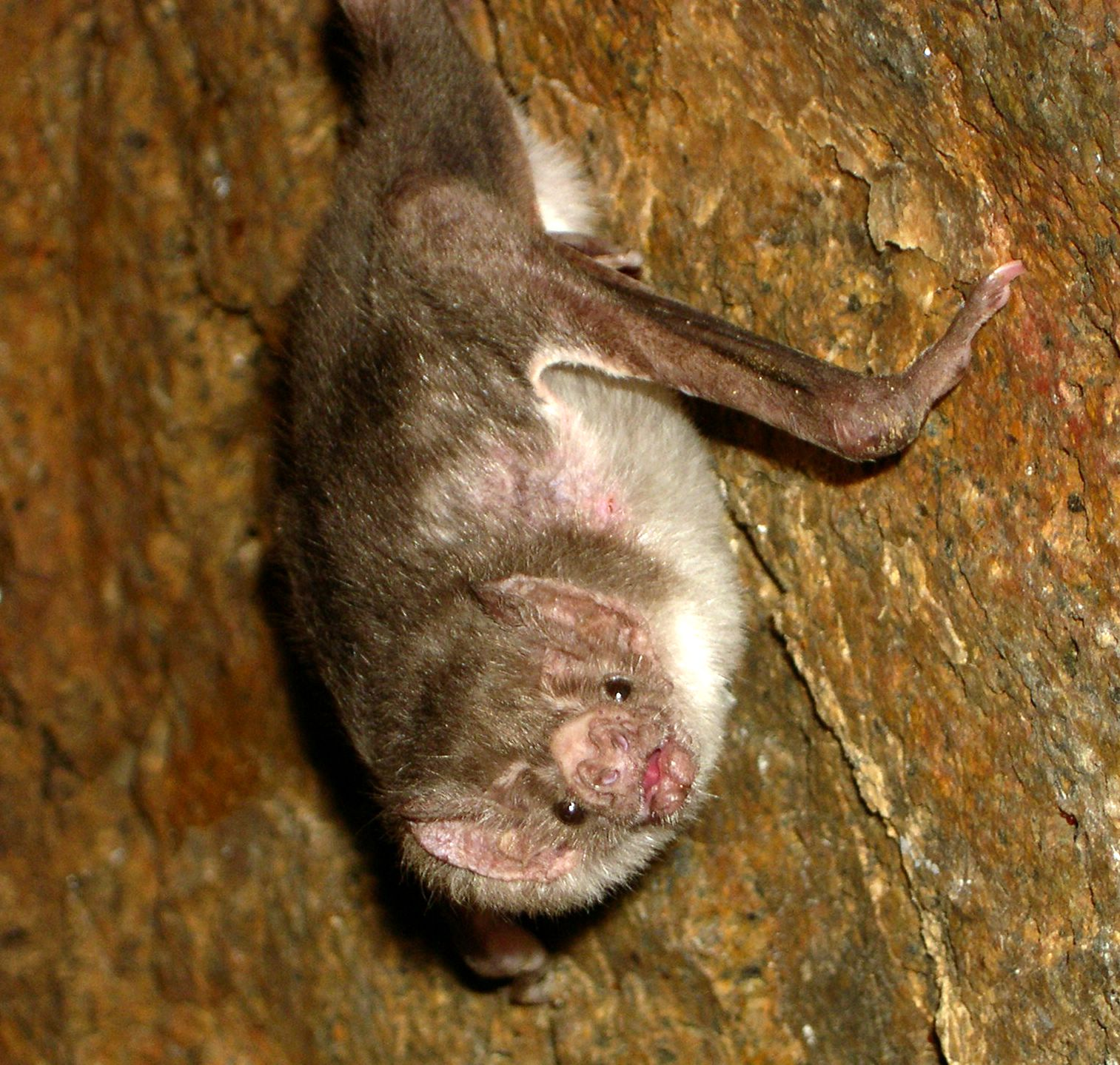
- Common vampire bat (Desmodus rotundus)

Scientific classification
- Kingdom: Animalia
- Phylum: Chordata
- Class: Mammalia
- Order: Chiroptera
- Family: Phyllostomidae
- Subfamily: Desmodontinae; Bonaparte, 1845

Genera
- Desmodus Wied-Neuwied, 1826; Diphylla Spix, 1823; Diaemus Miller, 1906.

= Vampire bat =

Subfamily of bats

Vampire bats, members of the subfamily Desmodontinae, are leaf-nosed bats currently found in Central and South America. Their food source is the blood of other animals, a dietary trait called hematophagy. Three extant bat species feed solely on blood: the common vampire bat (Desmodus rotundus), the hairy-legged vampire bat (Diphylla ecaudata), and the white-winged vampire bat (Diaemus youngi). Two extinct species of the genus Desmodus have been found in North America.

Contrary to its Latin name, the spectral bat (Vampyrum spectrum) does not feed on blood.

== Taxonomy ==
Due to differences among the three species, each has been placed within a different genus, each consisting of one extant species. In the older literature, these three genera were placed within a family of their own, Desmodontidae, but taxonomists have now grouped them as a subfamily, Desmodontinae, in the New World leaf-nosed bat family, Phyllostomidae.

The three known species of vampire bats all seem more similar to one another than to any other species. This suggests that hematophagy evolved only once, and thus that the three species share this presumed common ancestor.

The placement of these three genera, of the subfamily Desmodontinae (within the New-World leaf-nosed bat family, Phyllostomidae Gray, 1825) may be summarized as:

- subfamily Desmodontinae
  - genus Desmodus
    - Desmodus archaeodaptes, extinct,
    - Desmodus draculae, extinct,
    - Desmodus rotundus,
    - Desmodus stocki, extinct.
  - genus Diphylla
    - Diphylla ecaudata
  - genus Diaemus
    - Diaemus youngi

=== Evolution ===
Vampire bats are in a diverse family of bats that consume many food sources, including nectar, pollen, insects, fruit and meat. The three species of vampire bats are the only mammals that have evolved to feed exclusively on blood (hematophagy) as micropredators, a strategy within parasitism. Hematophagy is uncommon due to the number of challenges to overcome for success: a large volume of liquid potentially overwhelming the kidneys and bladder, the risk of iron poisoning, and coping with excess protein. There are multiple hypotheses for how vampire bats evolved.

- They evolved from frugivorous bats with sharp teeth specialized for piercing fruit
- They initially fed on the ectoparasites of large mammals, and then progressed to feeding on the mammals themselves (similar to red-billed oxpecker feeding behavior)
- They initially fed on insects that were attracted to the wounds of animals, and then progressed to feeding on the wounds
- They initially preyed on small arboreal vertebrates
- They were arboreal omnivores themselves and began ingesting blood and flesh from wound sites of larger animals
- They were specialized nectar-feeders that evolved to feed on another type of liquid

The vampire bat lineage diverged from its family 26 million years ago. The hairy-legged vampire bat likely diverged from the other two species of vampire bats 21.7 million years ago. Because the hairy-legged vampire bat feeds on bird blood and it is the most basal of living vampire bats, it is considered likely that the first vampire bats fed on bird blood as well. Recent analyses suggest that vampire bats arose from insectivores, which discount the frugivore, carnivore, and nectarivore hypotheses of origin. Within 4 million years of diverging from other Phyllostomidae, vampire bats had evolved all necessary adaptations for blood-feeding, making it one of the fastest examples of natural selection among mammals.

== Anatomy and physiology ==
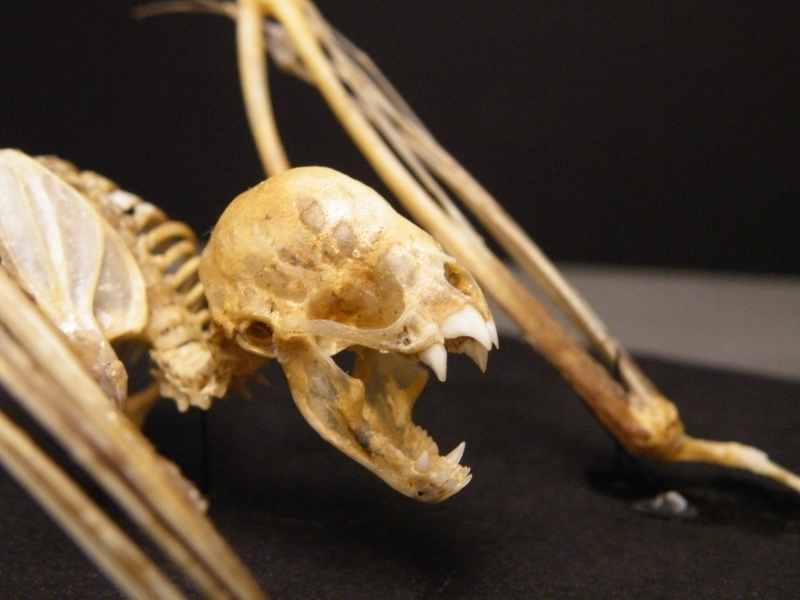
A vampire bat skeleton, showing the distinctive incisors and canines

Unlike fruit bats, the vampire bats have short, conical muzzles. They also lack a nose leaf, instead having naked pads with U-shaped grooves at the tip.

A vampire bat has front teeth that are specialized for cutting and back teeth that are much smaller than in other bats. The inferior colliculus, the part of the bat's brain that processes sound, is well adapted to detecting the regular breathing sounds of sleeping animals that serve as its main food source.

While other bats have almost lost the ability to maneuver on land, vampire bats can walk, jump, and even run by using a unique, bounding gait, in which the forelimbs instead of the hindlimbs are recruited for force production, as the wings are much more powerful than the legs. This ability to run seems to have evolved independently within the bat lineage.

Vampire bats also have a high level of resistance to a group of bloodborne viruses known as endogenous retroviruses, which insert copies of their genetic material into their host's genome.

It was recently discovered that the vampire bat's loss of the REP15 gene allows for enhanced iron secretion in adaptation to the high iron diet.

=== Infrared sensing ===
The common vampire bat, Desmodus rotundus, has specialized thermoreceptors on its nose, which aid the animal in locating areas of its prey where the blood flows close to the skin. A nucleus has been found in the brain of vampire bats that has a similar position and similar histology to the infrared receptor of infrared-sensing snakes, which are the only other known vertebrates capable of detecting infrared radiation (namely boas, pythons and pit vipers). A recent study has shown that common vampire bats tune a TRP-channel that is already heat-sensitive, TRPV1, by lowering its thermal activation threshold to about 30 °C (86 °F). This is achieved through alternative splicing of TRPV1 transcripts to produce a channel with a truncated carboxy-terminal cytoplasmic domain. These splicing events occur exclusively in trigeminal ganglia, and not in dorsal root ganglia, thereby maintaining a role for TRPV1 as a detector of noxious heat in somatic afferents.

== Ecology and life cycle ==
Vampire bats tend to live in colonies in almost completely dark places, such as caves, old wells, hollow trees, and buildings. They range in Central to South America and live in arid to humid, tropical and subtropical areas. Vampire bat colony numbers can range from single digits to hundreds in roosting sites. The basic social structure of roosting bats is made of female groups and their offspring, a few adult males, known as "resident males", and a separate group of males, known as "nonresident males". In hairy-legged vampire bats, the hierarchical segregation of nonresident males appears less strict than in common vampire bats. Nonresident males are accepted into the harems when the ambient temperature lowers. This behavior suggests social thermoregulation.

Resident males mate with the females in their harems, and it is less common for outside males to copulate with the females. Female offspring often remain in their natal groups. Several matrilines can be found in a group, as unrelated females regularly join groups. Male offspring tend to live in their natal groups until they are about two years old, sometimes being forcibly expelled by the resident adult males. Vampire bats on average live about nine years when they are in their natural environment in the wild.

Vampire bats form strong bonds with other members of the colony. A related unique adaptation of vampire bats is the sharing of food. A vampire bat can only survive about two days without feeding, yet they cannot be guaranteed of finding food every night. This poses a problem, so when a bat fails to find food, it will often "beg" another bat for food. A "donor" bat may regurgitate a small amount of blood to sustain the other member of the colony. For equally familiar bats, the predictive capacity of reciprocity surpasses that of relatedness. This finding suggests that vampire bats are capable of preferentially aiding their relatives, but that they may benefit more from forming reciprocal, cooperative relationships with relatives and non-relatives alike. Furthermore, donor bats were more likely to approach starving bats and initiate the food sharing. When individuals of a population are lost, bats with a larger number of mutual donors tend to offset their own energetic costs at a higher rate than bats that fed less of the colony before the removal. Individuals that spend their own energy as a social investment of sorts are more likely to thrive, and higher rates of survival incentivize the behavior and reinforce the importance of large social networks in colonies. These findings contradict the harassment hypothesis—which claims that individuals share food in order to limit harassment by begging individuals. All considered, vampire bat research should be interpreted cautiously as much of the evidence is correlational and still requires further testing.

Another ability that some vampire bats possess is identifying and monitoring the positions of conspecifics (individuals of the same species) simply by antiphonal calling. Similar in nature to the sound mother bats make to call to their pups, these calls tend to vary on a bat to bat basis which may help other bats identify individuals both in and outside of their roost.

Vampire bats also engage in social grooming. It usually occurs between females and their offspring, but it is also significant between adult females. Social grooming is mostly associated with food sharing.

== Feeding ==
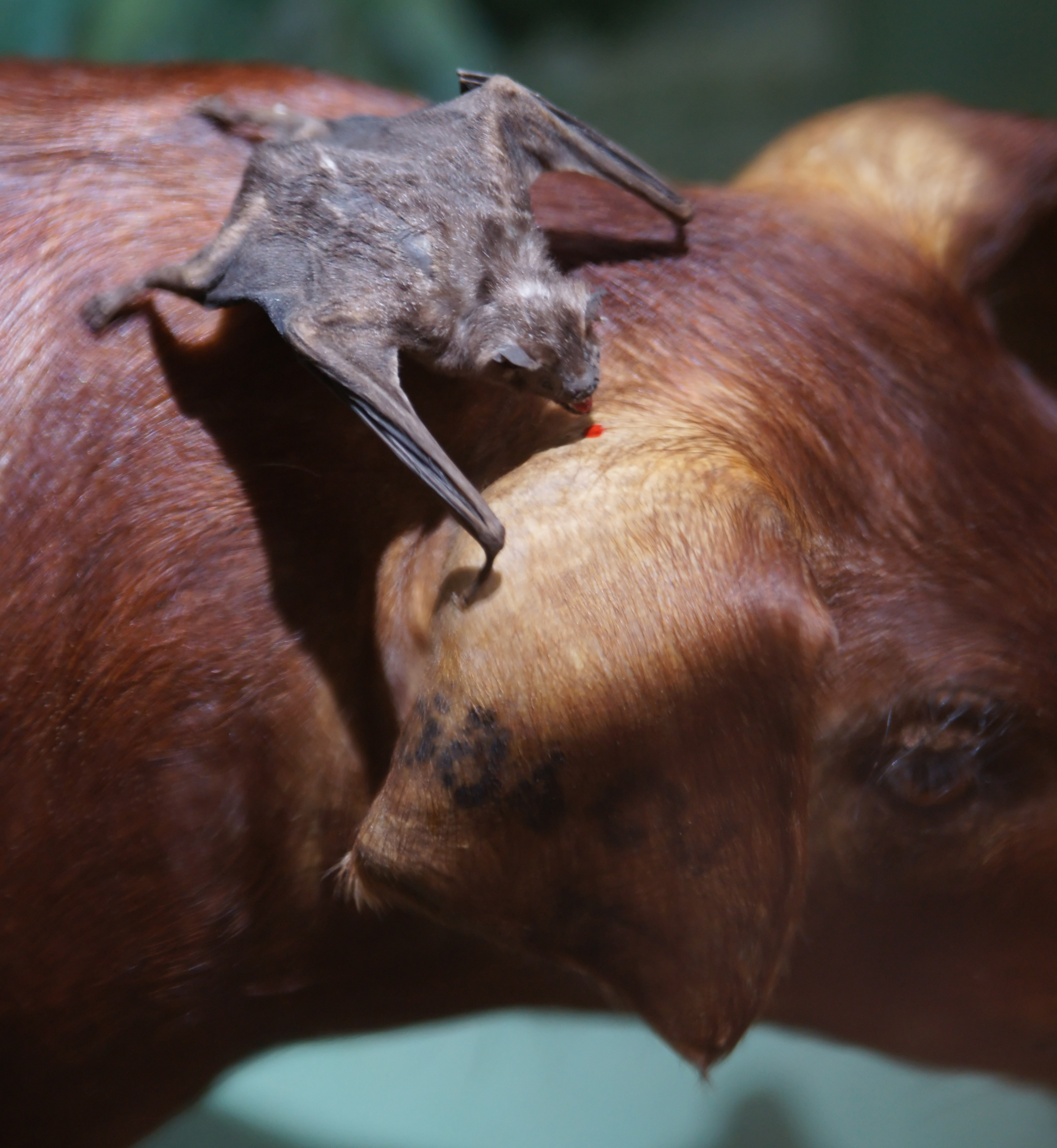
A vampire bat feeding on a pig (taxidermy specimens)

Vampire bats hunt only when it is fully dark. Like fruit-eating bats, and unlike insectivorous and fish-eating bats, they emit only low-energy sound pulses. The common vampire bat feeds primarily on the blood of mammals (occasionally including humans), whereas both the hairy-legged vampire bat and white-winged vampire bat feed primarily on the blood of birds. Once the common vampire bat locates a host, such as a sleeping mammal, it lands and approaches it on the ground while on all fours. It then likely uses thermoception to identify a warm spot on the skin to bite. They then start to lick the area over and over again to make the place tender so that it is easier to bite. They then create a small incision with their teeth and lap up blood from the wound. When feeding on sleeping humans, they typically target exposed areas of the body, such as the toes, nose and earlobes.

Vampire bats, like snakes, have developed highly sensitive thermosensation, with specialized systems for detecting infrared radiation. Snakes co-opt a non-heat-sensitive channel, vertebrate TRPA1 (transient receptor potential cation channel A1), to produce an infrared detector. However, vampire bats tune a channel that is already heat-sensitive, TRPV1, by lowering its thermal activation threshold to about 30 °C (86 °F), which allows them to sense the target.

As noted by Arthur M. Greenhall:

The most common species, the common vampire (Desmodus) is not fastidious and will attack any warm-blooded animal. The white-winged vampire (Diaemus) appears to have a special preference for birds and goats. In the laboratory it has not been possible to feed Diaemus on cattle blood.

If there is fur on the skin of the host, the common vampire bat uses its canine and cheek teeth like a barber's blades to shave away the hairs. The bat's razor-sharp upper incisor teeth then make a 7 mm wide and 8 mm deep cut. The upper incisors lack enamel, which keeps them permanently razor sharp. Their teeth are so sharp that even handling their skulls in a museum can result in cuts.

The bat's saliva, left in the victim's resulting bite wound, has a key function in feeding from the wound. The saliva contains several compounds that prolong bleeding, such as anticoagulants that inhibit blood clotting, and compounds that prevent the constriction of blood vessels near the wound.

Owing to their highly specialized diet, vampire bats have lost both TASR1 and TASR3 taste receptors, and are unable to taste umami or sweet flavors.

=== Digestion ===
A typical female vampire bat weighs 40 grams (1.4 oz) and can consume over 20 grams (1 fluid ounce) of blood in a 20-minute feed. This feeding behavior is facilitated by its anatomy and physiology for rapid processing and digestion of the blood to enable the animal to take flight soon after the feeding. The stomach and intestine rapidly absorb the water in the blood meal, which is quickly transported to the kidneys, and on to the bladder for excretion. A common vampire bat begins to expel urine within two minutes of feeding. While shedding much of the blood's liquid facilitates flight takeoff, the bat still has added almost 20–30% of its body weight in blood. To take off from the ground, the bat generates extra lift by crouching and flinging itself into the air. Typically, within two hours of setting out in search of food, the common vampire bat returns to its roost and settles down to spend the rest of the night digesting its meal. Digestion is aided by their microbiome, and their genome protects them against pathogens in the blood. Its stool is roughly the same as that from bats eating fruits or insects.

==== Metabolism ====
In a 2024 study published in Biology Letters, researchers explored how vampire bats generate energy from their blood meals, hypothesizing that they metabolize amino acids due to their low-carbohydrate and low-fat diet. The team captured two dozen vampire bats in Belize and fed them cow blood enriched with glycine and leucine. After consumption, the bats were placed on a treadmill for up to 90 minutes, during which breath samples were collected to measure oxygen intake and carbon dioxide output. The results revealed that up to 60% of the bats' energy production during exercise came from the rapid breakdown of these amino acids, revealing their ability to convert proteins into usable energy within ten minutes. Michael Hiller, a researcher at the LOEWE Center for Translational Biodiversity Genomics in Frankfurt, noted that this rapid metabolization of amino acids is "unparalleled in mammals" and described it as a compelling example of convergent evolution, where both vampire bats and blood-feeding insects developed similar strategies to adapt to their extreme diets.

This metabolic specialization presents drawbacks, as vampire bats have diminished their ability to store alternative energy sources, rendering them susceptible to starvation if they experience prolonged periods without feeding. To counteract this vulnerability, vampire bats engage in reciprocal altruism, regurgitating blood to assist conspecifics in need.

== Human health ==
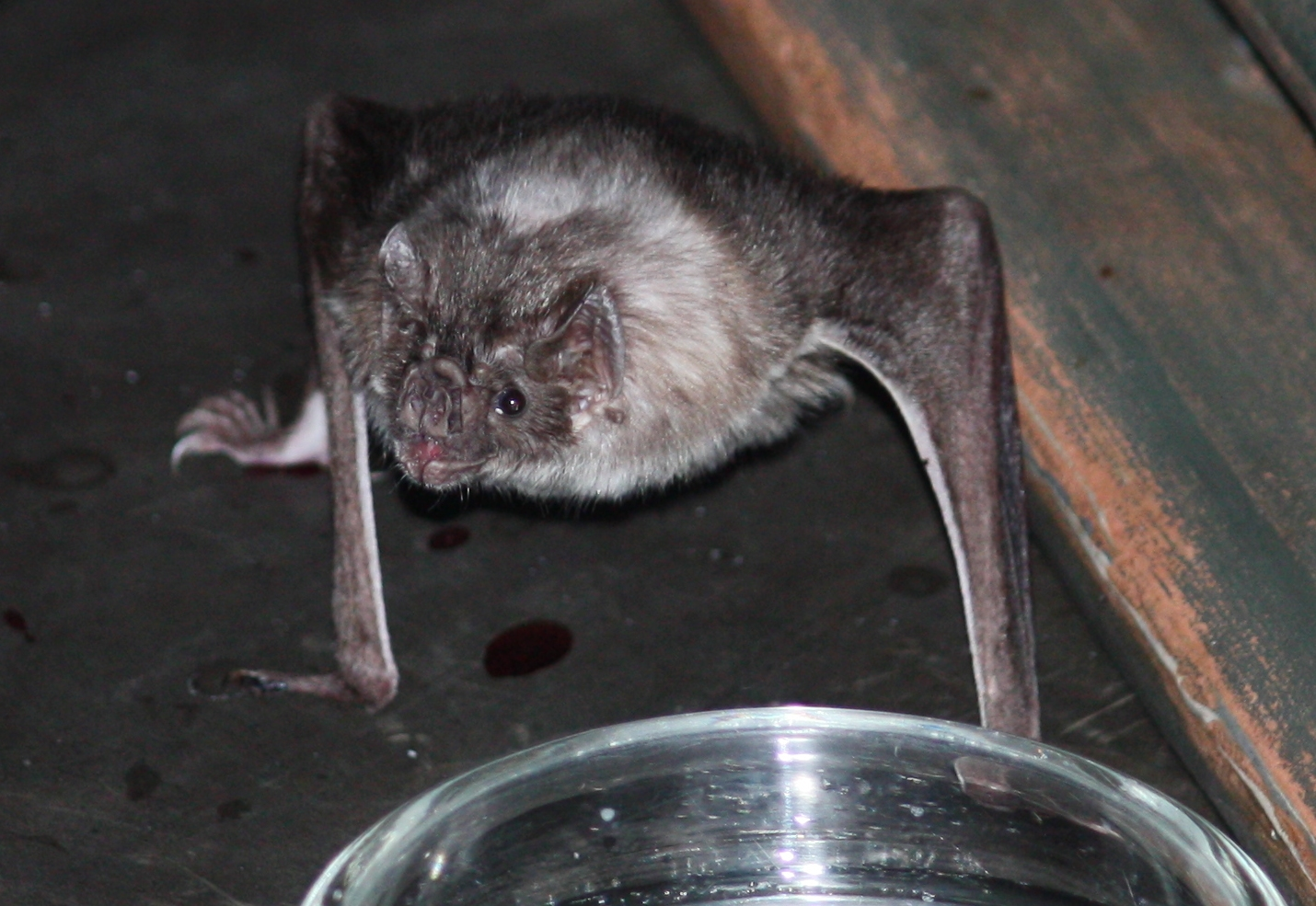
Common vampire bat at the Louisville Zoo

=== Rabies ===
Rabies can be transmitted to humans and other animals by vampire bat bites. Since dogs are now widely immunized against rabies, the number of human rabies transmissions by vampire bats exceeds those by dogs in Latin America, with 55 documented cases in 2005. The risk of infection to the human population is less than to livestock exposed to bat bites. Various estimates of the prevalence of rabies in bat populations have been made; it has been estimated that less than 1% of wild bats in regions where rabies is endemic are infected with the virus at any given time. Bats that are infected may be clumsy, disoriented, and unable to fly.

=== Anticoagulant drug ===
The unique properties of vampire bat saliva have found some positive use in medicine.

Various studies published in Stroke: Journal of the American Heart Association on a genetically engineered drug called desmoteplase which uses the anticoagulant properties of the saliva of Desmodus rotundus found that it increased blood flow in stroke patients.

== See also ==
- Ghost bat Macroderma gigas, also known as the Australian false vampire bat
- Infrared sensing in vampire bats
- Species of Megaderma, known as greater or lesser false vampire bat
- Spectral bat (Vampyrum spectrum), also called false vampire bat
- Vampire § Vampire bats
