= Stock's vampire bat =

Stock's vampire bat Temporal range: Pleistocene

Scientific classification
- Domain: Eukaryota
- Kingdom: Animalia
- Phylum: Chordata
- Class: Mammalia
- Order: Chiroptera
- Family: Phyllostomidae
- Genus: Desmodus
- Species: †D. stocki

Binomial name
- †Desmodus stocki Jones, 1958

Extinct species of bat

Desmodus stocki, or Stock's vampire bat, is an extinct species of vampire bat native to Pleistocene North America, inhabiting states including Arizona, West Virginia, and Florida, further north than any living vampire bats. It weighed about 50% more than the common vampire bat (Desmodus rotundus), and was also more robust.
