= Infrared sensing in vampire bats =

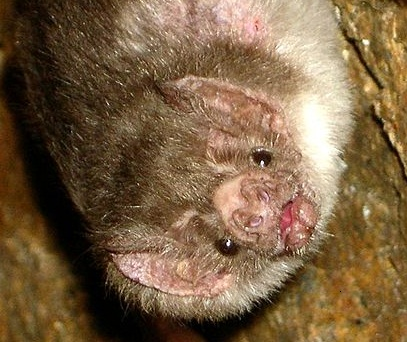
Vampire bat Desmodus rotundus.

Vampire bats have developed a specialized system using infrared-sensitive receptors on their nose-leaf to prey on homeothermic (warm-blooded) vertebrates. Trigeminal nerve fibers that innervate these IR-sensitive receptors may be involved in detection of infrared thermal radiation emitted by their prey. This may aid bats in locating blood-rich areas on their prey. In addition, neuroanatomical and molecular research has suggested possible similarities of IR-sensing mechanisms between vampire bats and IR-sensitive snakes. Infrared sensing in vampire bats has not yet been hypothesized to be image forming, as it was for IR-sensitive snakes. While the literature on IR-sensing in vampire bats is thin, progress continues to be made in this field to identify how vampire bats can sense and use infrared thermal radiation.

Vampire bats are the only known mammals whose entire nutrition relies on blood from mammals or birds. In the family Phyllostomidae and the subfamily Desmodontinae, there are three known species of vampire bats: Desmodus rotundus (common vampire bat), Diphylla ecaudata (hairy-legged vampire bat), and Diaemus youngi (white-winged vampire bat). Most of the referenced research on infrared sensing in vampire bats has been done on the common vampire bat because this is the most commonly found species.

== Behavior ==
Vampire bats were not studied in their natural habitats until about 1935. During predation, bats first spend a few minutes in the air circling the target prey, eventually landing on the back or neck crest of the animal, and sometimes the ground. They then proceed to search for a suitable spot to bite, which can take seconds to minutes, and usually will feed on the neck or flank. The same spot may be fed on multiple times by different bats. Kürten and Schmidt (1982) were the first to suggest that infrared perception in vampire bats is possibly used in detecting regions of maximal blood flow on targeted prey. Although warm receptors are also found in the facial regions of species such as mice, humans, and dogs, the extreme low-temperature sensitivity of these receptors on vampire bats suggest specialization for sensing infrared. (see section on Physiology).

In 1982, Kürten and Schmidt performed behavioral studies to examine the ability of vampire bats to detect infrared radiation. Their study showed that when given a choice between a warm and cold object, vampire bats can be trained to choose the infrared emitting signal unit (SU). Two SUs made of a heating element with a copper plate backing were mounted on a wall. For each trial, one SU was warmed while the other was maintained at room temperature. The heating and warming of the SUs were interchanged at random between trials. If bats chose the warm SU correctly, they were rewarded with food through a feeding tube below each SU. In this study, olfactory and visual stimuli were minimized to ascertain that only thermal cues affected behavioral learning. Olfactory cues were eliminated by the full feeding tube attached behind the opening from which the bats received their rewards. Dim lighting minimized visual cues of the two SUs.

== Anatomy ==
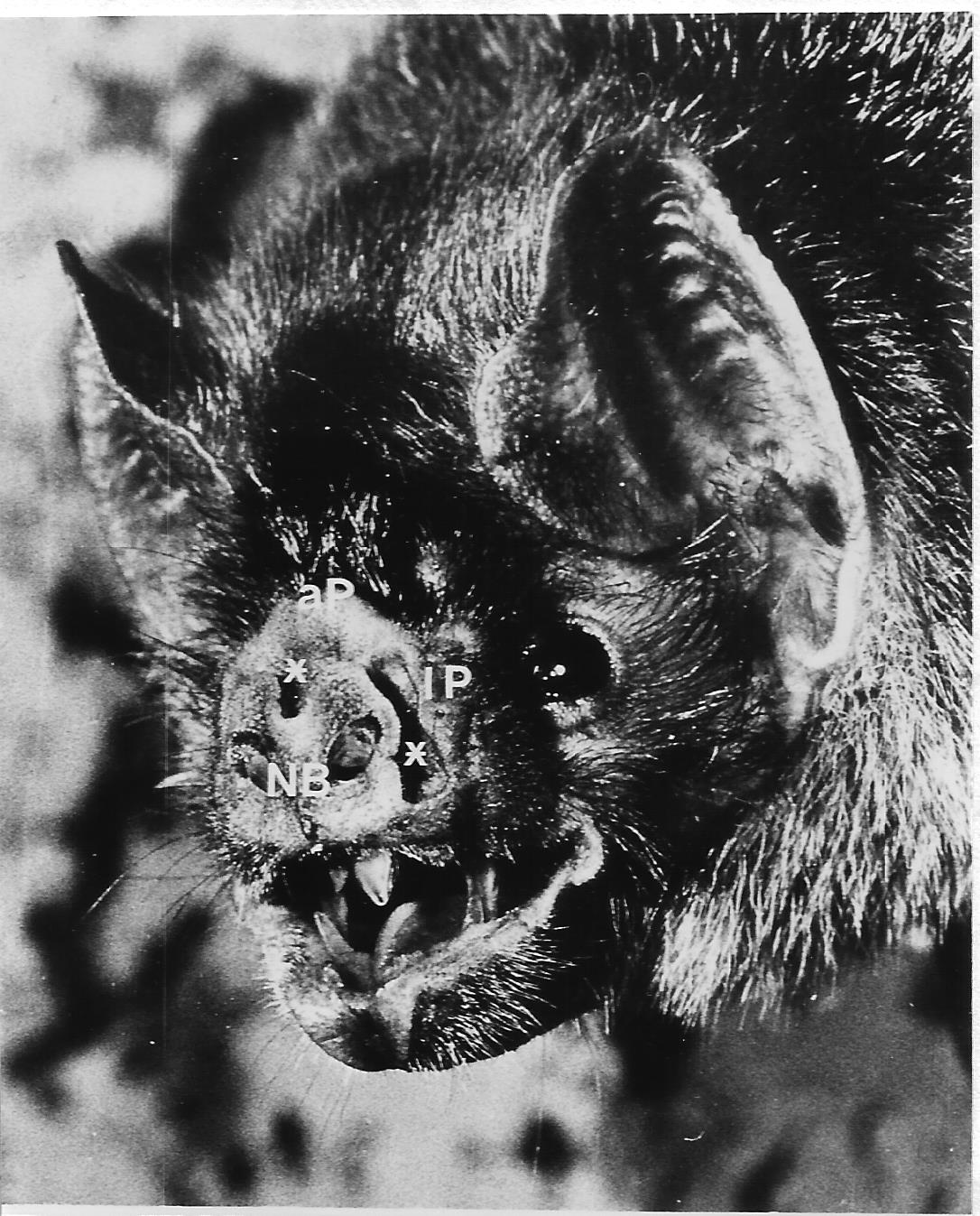
Head of Desmodus rotundus: Indicated is position of nasal pits (*), apical pad (aP) and lateral pad (lP).

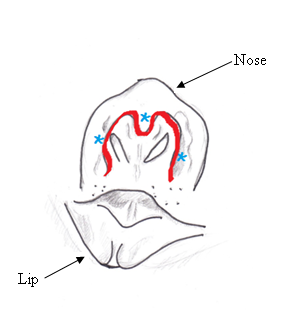
Nasal structure of Desmodus rotundus: Stars indicate position of nasal pits and red outlines the nose-leaf.

The central nose-leaf and a semicircular ring of pads construct the nasal structure of the vampire bat. There are also three depressions known as nasal or leaf pits, located between the nose-leaf and pads. Two lateral pits, one on each side of the nose-leaf, are situated at 45° angles towards the nose-leaf. The apical pit is slightly raised and directed upward and forward relative to the nose-leaf. The pits are about 1 millimeter wide and 1 millimeter deep, hairless, and glandless. A layer of dense connective-tissue with sparsely distributed blood vessels insulates the nasal structure. Based on structure alone, these pits were first suggested to house IR-receptors.

=== Neuroanatomy ===
Kürten and Schmidt (1982) first suggested that the location and orientation of each pit structure provided directional information in infrared radiation detection. From their initial studies, the nasal pits seemed to be ideal for purposes of IR-perception. Later in 1984, Kürten and collaborators made electrophysiological recordings from nerve fibers of temperature-sensitive infrared thermoreceptors located on the central nose-leaf and upper lip, but did not find such receptors in the nasal pits (see Physiology). This revoked their earlier hypothesis and established that the infrared-sensitive receptors are located on the central nose-leaf. Schäfer and collaborators confirmed this by recording impulses from thermoreceptors on the nose-leaf as well.

Klüver-Barrera and Nissl staining of vampire bat brain sections uncovered a unique nucleus located lateral to the descending trigeminal tract (dv). The nucleus is composed of neuropils and medium-sized cells, which is very similar to the nucleus (DLV) in the lateral descending trigeminal system in IR-sensitive snakes. This special nucleus is found in all three species of vampire bats and no other bats, but does not necessarily indicate a direct connection with infrared sensing. More recent studies using in situ hybridization studies have located large diameter neurons in the trigeminal ganglia (TG) that are unique to vampire bats and extremely similar to those found in IR-sensitive snakes. Although the morphological organization of neurons suggests convergent evolution with IR-sensing snakes lineages, it remains unclear what the exact neural pathway is for infrared sensing in vampire bats.

== Physiology ==
Thermography, a method which produces pictures of the distribution of temperatures on an object, was used to investigate temperature variation across facial structures of the common vampire bat. The nasal structure has a temperature of 9 °C lower than the rest of the face. The thermal insulation of the nasal structure and maintained temperature difference may possibly prevent interference of self-emitted thermal radiation. Warm receptors located in the nose may then optimally detect outside sources of infrared radiation.

Vampire bats are sensitive to power densities (a measure of emitted energy) greater than 50 μW/cm^{2} at distances between 13 and 16 cm (a power density of 1.8 × 10^{−4}W/cm^{2} corresponds to 50 °C). This was first determined by quantifying the temperature at which vampire bats could not behaviorally distinguish between heat emitting and room temperature SUs. A positive linear relationship exists between the energy-threshold of heat detection and distance from stimuli. Through mathematical calculations, at a distance of 8 cm, vampire bats should be able to detect humans who emit radiation of 80 μW/cm^{2}. Temperature threshold measurements were directly measured by stimulating nerve fibers of thermoreceptors in the nose-leaf and upper lip with a water-circulated brass thermode and recording the impulses/second at every 5 °C shift in temperature from 10 to 40 °C. These receptors have a threshold of 28 °C and a maximum temperature response to 40 °C, beyond which there was either no firing or an irregular firing pattern. This threshold is 8 °C lower compared to those of warm receptor in other species of mammals, which implies extreme sensitivity to heat. After stimulation of these receptors, there is a transient increase in impulse activity which quickly decays due to adaptation and thus strengthens temporal acuity.

== Molecular mechanism of infrared detection ==
A family of TRP (transient receptor potential) channels, including TRPV1 (transient receptor potential vanilloid) and TRPA1 (transient receptor potential cation channel A1), is important in thermal and pain detection. TRPV1 channels are activated by capsaicin (a chemical which can be extracted from chili peppers), noxious temperature ranges (>43 °C), membrane-derived lipids, low pH, and voltage changes. Activation of TRPV1 by capsaicin results in calcium and sodium influx, and functionally allows for detection of painful thermal stimuli. TRPV1 may also act as a molecular thermometer in response to temperatures greater than 43 °C. The result is an inward calcium and sodium current similar to capsaicin-evoked currents. TRPV1 channels may also have voltage-sensitive properties responsible for its activation. Phosphorylation and mutations, especially at the C-terminus (carboxylic acid end of primary amino acid sequence), can alter the threshold temperature of heat-activation. The specific mechanism behind heat-activation of TRPV1 channels has yet to be deciphered.

=== TRPV1-S ===
TRPV1-S (TRPV1 short) is an isoform of the capsaicin receptor TRPV1 and comprises 35-46% of TRPV1 transcripts in the trigeminal ganglia of common vampire bats. Deep sequencing of complementary DNA of these receptor channels shows that this is not true for closely related fruit bats Carollia brevicauda (< 6% TRPV1-S) and other fruit, nectar, or insect feeding bats (Uroderma bilobatum, Sturnira lilium, and Anoura cultrata) (<1% TRPV1-S). TRPA1 channels in pit-bearing snakes, such as the western diamondback rattlesnake (Crotalus atrox), are sensitive to infrared thermal radiation as well. TRPA1 transcripts are mostly found in the TG of IR-sensitive snake lineages as was for bats.

TRPV1-S isoform results from alternative splicing during post-transcriptional regulation, a variation of the TRPV1 C-terminus due to insertion of 23-base-pair sequence, exon14a, that contains a stop codon. The inserted sequence is flanked by two introns marked with GT/AG donor-acceptor sites that are necessary for U2-dependent splicing. Consequently, incorporation or bypass of exon14a results in the short or long isoforms, respectively. It is suggested that efficient splicing of the exon14a segment necessitates the specialized environment of TG in vampire bats. Compared to the long isoform (threshold ~ 40 °C), the temperature threshold of channel activation is much lower for TRPV1-S. TRPV1-S channels expressed in HEK293 cells and Xenopus oocytes (cells commonly used for manipulation of expressing certain genes) have a threshold of 30 °C. This is highly consistent with in vitro studies pertaining to temperature thresholds of IR-sensitive receptors in vampire bats (28 °C). Activation of TRPV1-S channels in the TG may then suggest a similar mechanism (as seen in IR-sensing snakes) for how infrared sensing may work in vampire bats. Trigeminal nerves which innervate specialized temperature sensitive receptors on the nose-leaf may in turn activate TRPV1-S channels in the TG in response to infrared thermal radiation.

== See also ==
- Vampire bat
- Neuroethology
- Infrared sensing in snakes
