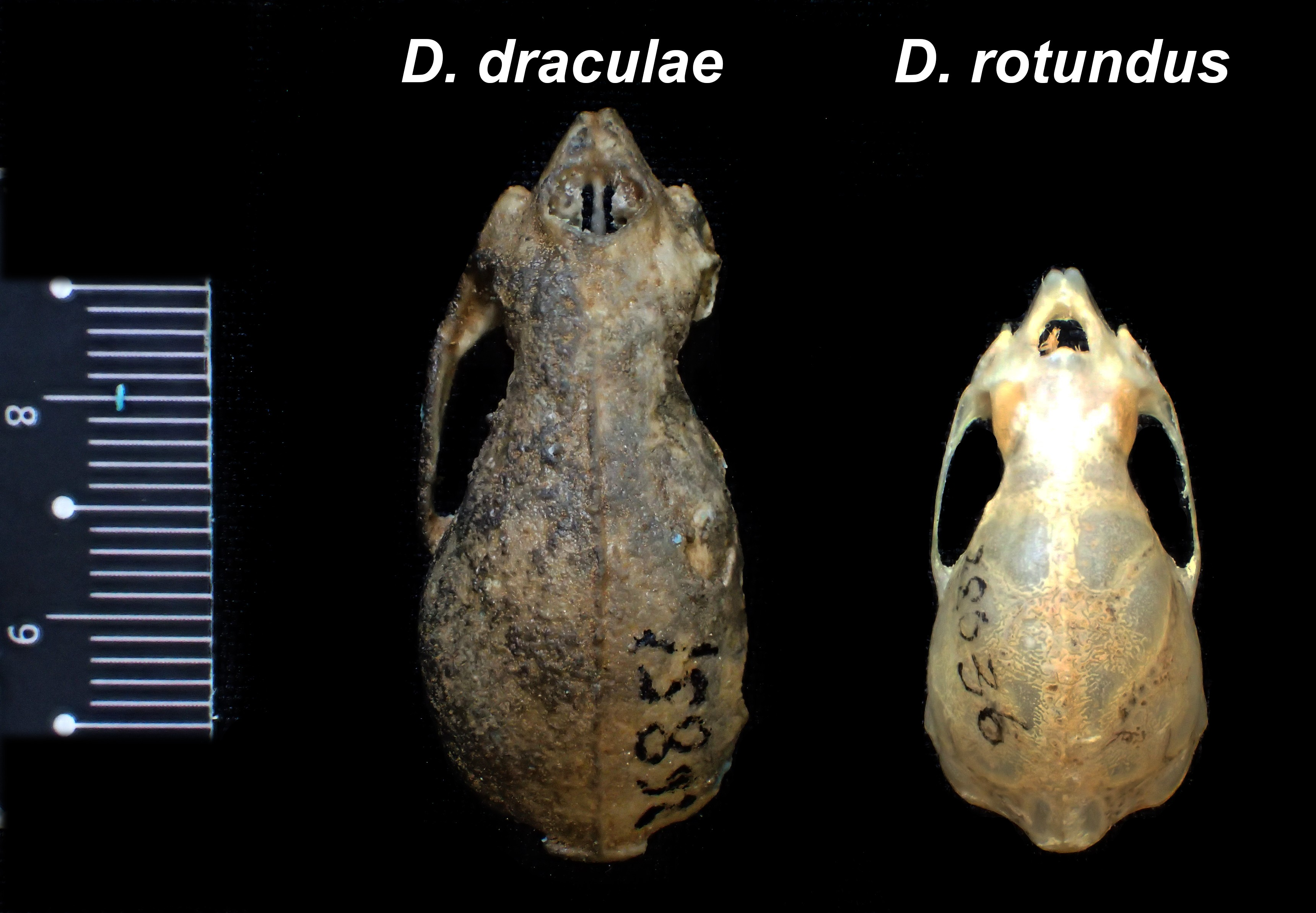

Conservation status
- Extinct (IUCN 3.1)

Scientific classification
- Kingdom: Animalia
- Phylum: Chordata
- Class: Mammalia
- Order: Chiroptera
- Family: Phyllostomidae
- Genus: Desmodus
- Species: †D. draculae

Binomial name
- †Desmodus draculae Morgan et al. 1988

= Desmodus draculae =

Desmodus draculae Temporal range: Pleistocene (Uquian-Lujanian)-Holocene ~2.5–0.01 Ma

Extinct species of bat

Desmodus draculae is an extinct species of vampire bat that inhabited Central and South America during the Pleistocene, and possibly the early Holocene. It was 30% larger than its living relative the common vampire bat (Desmodus rotundus). Fossils and unmineralized subfossils have been found in Argentina, Mexico, Ecuador, Brazil, Venezuela, Belize, and Bolivia.

Most records of D. draculae are from the late Pleistocene, but some are from the Holocene. A Desmodus canine tooth discovered in Buenos Aires Province, Argentina came from sediments dated at 300 years BP (ca. 1650 A.D.); this fossil was tentatively assigned to D. draculae.

== Taxonomy and etymology ==
The first Desmodus draculae fossil was located in Cueva del Guácharo in Venezuela in 1965 by Omar J. Linares, which he noted in 1968 as a possible Pleistocene species of Desmodus. (Note: Una forma de Desmodus posiblemente del Pleistocene … mayor que todas las conocidas … una nuevaespecie." — Linares 1968:138–139.) A formal and accepted description of the species was published in 1988, designating the collection by Linares, a skull and post-cranial material, as the type specimen.

The authors assigned the specific epithet draculae, noting "the largest known chiropteran vampire commemorates Count Dracula, the greatest human vampire of folklore", and placed the novel species with the genus Desmodus. Desmodus draculae has been occasionally called the giant vampire bat in reference to its greater relative size.

== Description ==
It is the largest-known vampire bat to have ever lived. The length of its skull is 31.2 mm (1.23 in), and its humerus length was approximately 51 mm (2.0 in), as compared to the extant common vampire bat at 32.4–42.4 mm (1.28–1.67 in). Its skull was long and narrow, and its face had an upturned snout.

Based on its skull dimensions, it may have had a wingspan of approximately 50 cm (20 in) and a body mass of 60 g (2.1 oz). The proportions are equivalent to a smaller megabat or larger microbat of modern chiropteran fauna.

Its braincase was 14.5–14.8 mm (0.57–0.58 in) wide and 13.4–14.8 mm (0.53–0.58 in) high.

== Biology ==
Some researchers believe that D. draculae would have preyed on megafauna, while others believe that they would have preyed on rodents belonging to the family Caviomorpha. Other potential prey items that would have been available to D. draculae include plains viscacha, deer, and camelids.

== Range and habitat ==
Fossils of D. draculae have been found in Mexico, Belize, Venezuela, Brazil, and Argentina, in six caves total. The discovery of a vampire bat fossil in Argentina also represents the southernmost point that they have been recorded by 600 km (370 mi), possibly indicating that this region was at least 2 °C (3.6 °F) warmer during this time. Though there are no fossils to corroborate this, it is believed that its range might have included Ecuador, French Guiana, and Guyana. The species was likely widely distributed throughout South America.

== Extinction ==
The species is regarded as geologically extinct, as only bones of it have been documented and it has not been reported in surveys. However, its extinction is assumed to be geologically recent, as some of its remains discovered were not yet fossilized. The date and reason for its extinction are currently unknown. One hypothesis for its extinction states that it was highly specialized on megafaunal mammals as prey, which became extinct in the Quaternary extinction event, and D. draculae was unable to switch to smaller prey. Anecdotal reports of "large bats attacking cattle and horses" in Brazil are likely first-hand exaggerations of bat species whose behaviour is recorded as interacting with these animals.

== In culture ==
It has been speculated that D. draculae was part of the inspiration for the Mayan bat-god Camazotz. D. draculae could have also inspired legends of the Mura people, an indigenous people in Brazil, about the Caoera—a blood-eating bat the size of a vulture.
