= Desmoteplase =

Medication

Salivary plasminogen activator alpha 1
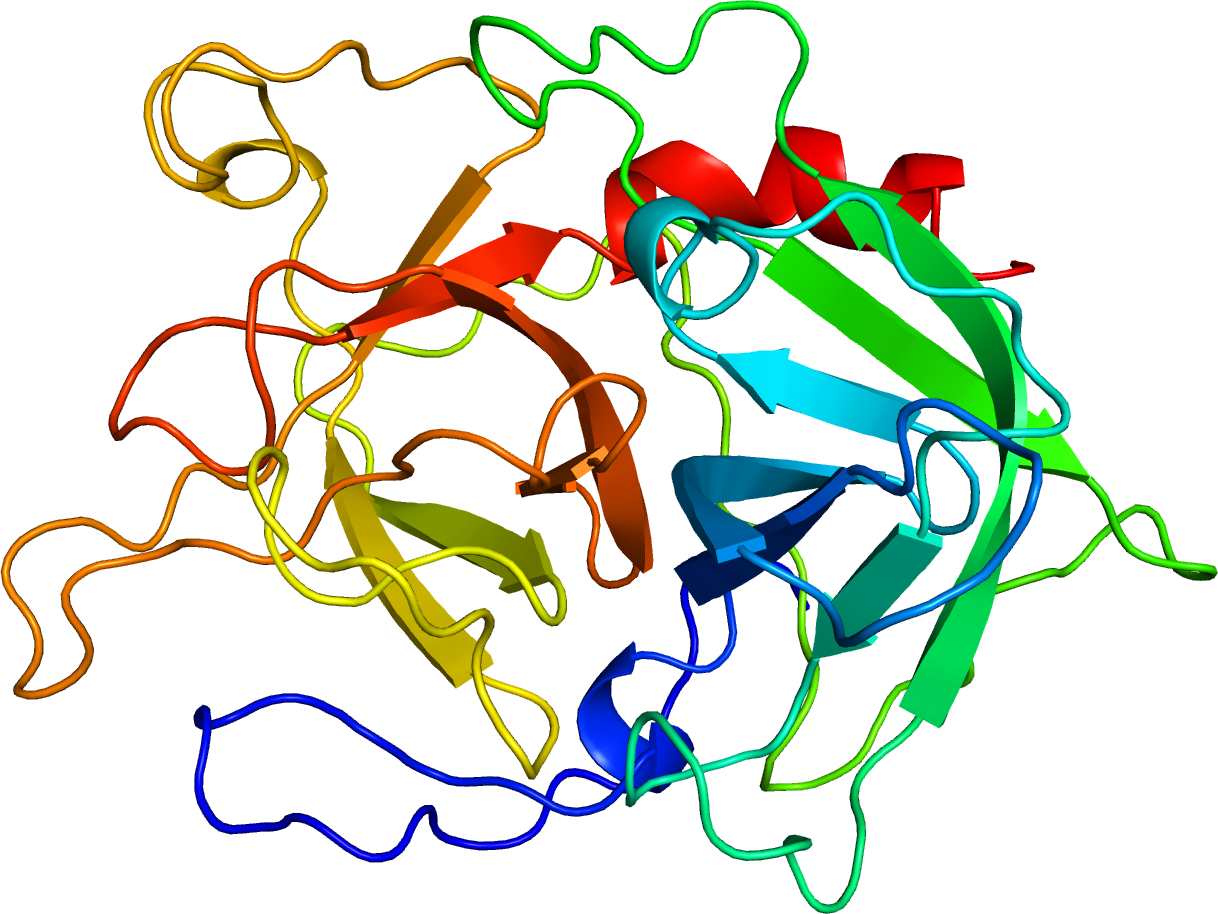

Identifiers
- Organism: Desmodus rotundus
- Symbol: PLAT
- Alt. symbols: BAT-PA; DSPA-5
- ATC code: B01
- CAS number: 145137-38-8
- DrugBank: DB04925
- Entrez: 112321404
- HomoloGene: 717
- PDB: 1A5I
- RefSeq (mRNA): XM_024578803.1
- RefSeq (Prot): XP_024434571.1
- UniProt: P98119

Other data
- EC number: 3.4.21.68
- Chromosome: Unplaced: 1.98 - 2.01 Mb
Search for
- Structures: Swiss-model
- Domains: InterPro

Desmoteplase is a novel, highly fibrin-specific "clot-busting" (thrombolytic) drug in development that reached phase III clinical trials. The Danish pharmaceutical company, Lundbeck, owns the worldwide rights to Desmoteplase. In 2009, two large trials (DIAS-3 and DIAS-4) were started to test it as a safe and effective treatment for patients with acute ischaemic stroke. After disappointing results in DIAS-3, DIAS-4 was terminated, and in December 2014 Lundbeck announced that they would stop the development of desmoteplase.

Desmoteplase is a recombinant form of the alpha-1 isoform of DSPA (Desmodus rotundus salivary plasminogen activator).

== Mode of action ==
Desmoteplase, a chemical found in the saliva of vampire bats, has the effect of catalysing the conversion of plasminogen to plasmin, which is the enzyme responsible for breaking down fibrin blood clots.

== Discovery of desmoteplase ==
As early as in 1932, the saliva of the vampire bat (Desmodus rotundus) was known to lead to interference with the haemostatic mechanism of the host animal. In 1991, the DNA coding of four plasminogen activators present in the saliva of the vampire bat was completed. Of the four, recombinant D. rotundus salivary plasminogen activator alpha 1 (rDSPAα1; desmoteplase) was investigated further.

== Chemical structure ==
The structure of desmoteplase is similar to rt-PA (alteplase), but it does not contain the plasmin-sensitive cleavage site and the lysine-binding Kringle 2 domain. As a result, desmoteplase, in comparison to rt-PA, has high fibrin selectivity (100,000- v. 550-fold increase in catalytic activity), an absence of neurotoxicity, and no apparent negative effect on the blood–brain barrier. Desmoteplase also has a half-life of about four hours; rtPA has a terminal plasma half-life of about 5 minutes.

== Desmoteplase in acute ischaemic stroke clinical trial program ==
The two phase II trials DIAS and DEDAS indicated that when intravenous (IV) desmoteplase was administered three to 9 hours after onset of ischaemic stroke symptoms, it was associated with a high rate of reperfusion and a low rate of symptomatic intracranial haemorrhage at doses up to 125 μg/kg. In the subsequent DIAS-2 trial, the same benefit could not be shown. This could be explained by the inclusion of a substantial number of patients with a mild stroke at baseline and small mismatch volumes associated with no vessel occlusion. Post hoc analyses of the DIAS-2 data and the pooled data of the DIAS, DEDAS and DIAS-2 data showed that patients who had a proximal cerebral vessel occlusion or high-grade stenosis on baseline angiography, had a positive response for desmoteplase.

In 2009, the DIAS-3 and DIAS-4 phase III trials started, each planning to enroll 400 patients worldwide who had had an acute ischaemic stroke. Participants are treated with desmoteplase as an intravenous bolus dose of 90 μg/kg within three to 9 hours after stroke symptom onset. Patients are selected with occlusion or high-grade stenosis (TIMI 0-1) in proximal cerebral arteries as assessed by magnetic resonance or computed tomography angiography. Wherever possible, additional perfusion-weighted imaging and diffusion-weighted imaging assessments will be done.

The outcomes of DIAS-3 and DIAS-4 studies should tell whether desmoteplase is a breakthrough treatment for acute ischaemic stroke. In June 2014, Lundbeck published a press release about the DIAS-3 study revealing neutral results in an intention-to-treat analysis. The proportion of patients presenting good clinical outcome was comparable in the desmoteplase group (51.3%) and in the placebo group (49.8%). Notably, Lundbeck mentioned that, when analysing per protocol, desmoteplase showed an effect relative to placebo. Publication of the final results is still awaited.

After the disappointing results in DIAS-3, the DIAS-4 trial was terminated. In December 2014 Lundbeck announced they would stop the development of desmoteplase and the company made a write-down of 309 million Danish crowns.

== Significance of the time window ==
Current standards of treatment allow for IV rt-PA up to 4.5 hours in ischaemic stroke. After this time window, the benefit is typically thought to be outweighed by the risk of brain haemorrhage. Interarterial approaches are thought to be useful up to six hours. Nevertheless, CT-perfusion scans and MRI-perfusion versus MRI-diffusion demonstrate that even after six hours a significant ischaemic penumbra of brain tissue may be salvageable. Some approaches to this involves mechanical removal of clot (for example the Merci device, the penumbra device and removable stents like Solitaire).

If desmoteplase can extend the IV treatment window to 9 hours, this would allow a much larger percentage of ischaemic stroke patients to receive active thrombolytic treatment – including patients who were delayed in getting to the hospital and neurological assessment. This could make a substantial difference in stroke outcomes. A 9-hour treatment window could also have a major impact on the treatment of "wake-up" strokes - where a patient awoke with symptoms, and is not sure whether the stroke occurred within the past 4.5 hours.
