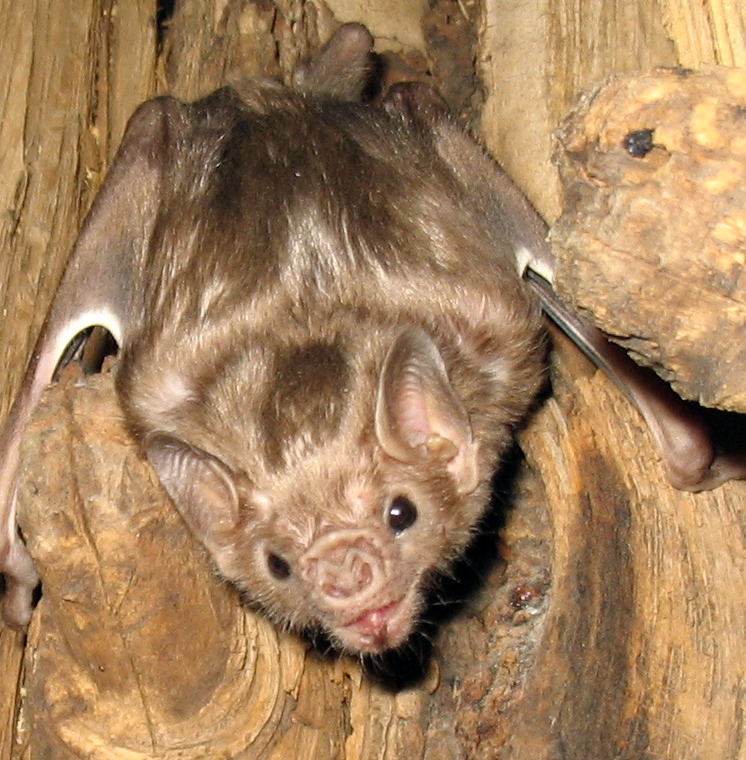

Conservation status
- Least Concern (IUCN 3.1)

Scientific classification
- Kingdom: Animalia
- Phylum: Chordata
- Class: Mammalia
- Order: Chiroptera
- Family: Phyllostomidae
- Genus: Diaemus; Miller, 1906
- Species: D. youngi

Binomial name
- Diaemus youngi Jentink, 1893
- Range map

Synonyms
- Diaemus youngii; Desmodus youngii

= White-winged vampire bat =

Species of mammals belonging to the New World leaf-nosed bat family

The white-winged vampire bat (Diaemus youngi), a species of vampire bat, is the only member of the genus Diaemus. They are found from Mexico to northern Argentina and are present on the islands of Trinidad and Margarita Island.

== Etymology and taxonomy ==
The white-winged vampire bat was described by Dutch zoologist Fredericus Anna Jentink in 1893. Dr. Charles Grove Young (1849–1934) is the eponym for the species name youngi. Jentink decided to honor Young with the species name because "our Museum is indebted [to him] for so many additions to its collections of the British Guyana animals." When it was described by Jentink in 1893, it was initially placed in the same genus as the common vampire bat, Desmodus. However, in 1907, Gerrit Smith Miller Jr. placed it in a new genus, Diaemus. That move to a new genus was not immediately accepted, however, with authors continuing to place it in Desmodus until at least 1982.

== Description ==
Their fur is clay-colored, light brown, or dark cinnamon brown. The outline of their wings is white, as well as the membrane between their second and third finger. Their ears are longer than they are wide, at 18 mm (0.71 in) long. The anterior surface of the tragus is hairy, and its outer margin is smooth, unlike that of the common vampire bat, which is serrated. Their thumb is much shorter than that of the common vampire bat. Their forearms are 51–54 mm (2.0–2.1 in) long. The calcar is absent. Their dental formula is 1.1.1.22.1.2.1, for a total of 22 teeth; the common vampire bat has 20 teeth and the hairy-legged vampire bat 26, respectively.

It is the only bat species in the world with 22 teeth. The last upper molars are vestigial, though, and older individuals sometimes lose them. The uropatagium and forearms are sparsely furred. From nose to tail, they are approximately 84 mm (3.3 in) long. They weigh 31.7–48.1 g (1.12–1.70 oz). Both males and females have cup-shaped scent glands located in their mouths. These glands might be an anti-predator defense, as the bats produce a foul-smelling odor from these glands when they are disturbed. Compared to other bats, their brains are especially large in relation to their body sizes—2.7–2.9% by body mass. This may be because their foraging strategy requires more complex thought (such as maintaining stealth) than other species. Their eyes are also relatively large in relation to their body sizes.

== Biology ==
Like other vampire bats, their saliva contains plasminogen activators, which rapidly dissolves the host's blood clots that form during feeding; platelet aggregation inhibitors, which prevent the formation of blood clots; and other anticoagulants. These compounds in their saliva are especially effective on birds. Birds, including free-ranging poultry species (chickens, guinea fowl, and turkeys), are their preferred prey source, but they will also prey on mammals such as goats and cattle. While it can transmit rabies, this appears to be relatively uncommon: the only reports of rabies transmission from this species are from Trinidad. They are not as adept as common vampire bats at quadrupedal locomotion, possibly because their thumbs are much shorter. However, they are quite adept at climbing branches. Females are polyestrous, capable of becoming pregnant multiple times a year. They give birth to one pup at a time. They will roost with many other species of bat, including the greater sac-winged bat, lesser dog-like bat, big-eared woolly bat, tailed tailless bat, Seba's short-tailed bat, little yellow-shouldered bat, great fruit-eating bat, white-lined broad-nosed bat, Pallas's long-tongued bat, Handley's nectar bat, white-bellied big-eared bat, greater spear-nosed bat, Parnell's mustached bat, Wagner's mustached bat, buffy broad-nosed bat, and common vampire bat. Their karyotype consists of 32 chromosomes.

Predation of this bat likely occurs on young in roosts by small predators, such as snakes, and by birds of prey on bats leaving roosts.

== Range and habitat ==
They have been found in Argentina, Bolivia, Brazil, Colombia, Costa Rica, Ecuador, El Salvador, French Guiana, Guatemala, Guyana, Mexico, Nicaragua, Panama, Paraguay, Peru, Suriname, Trinidad and Tobago, and Venezuela. They have flexible roosting and foraging habitat requirements. They prefer moist, open areas, but will still forage in dry deciduous or evergreen forests. They will roost in both tree cavities and caves.

== Conservation ==
They are consistently assessed as least concern by the IUCN. While it is infrequently encountered, it has a broad distribution, and is tolerant of a variety of habitats. The population is assumed to be large.

They can be maintained in captivity. Captive populations can be supported with cow and chicken blood. Blood must be defibrinated to prevent clotting. Each bat ingests approximately 16 ml (0.56 imp fl oz; 0.54 US fl oz) of blood per day. They are social animals, and should be maintained in colonies. Their colonies have dominance hierarchies.
