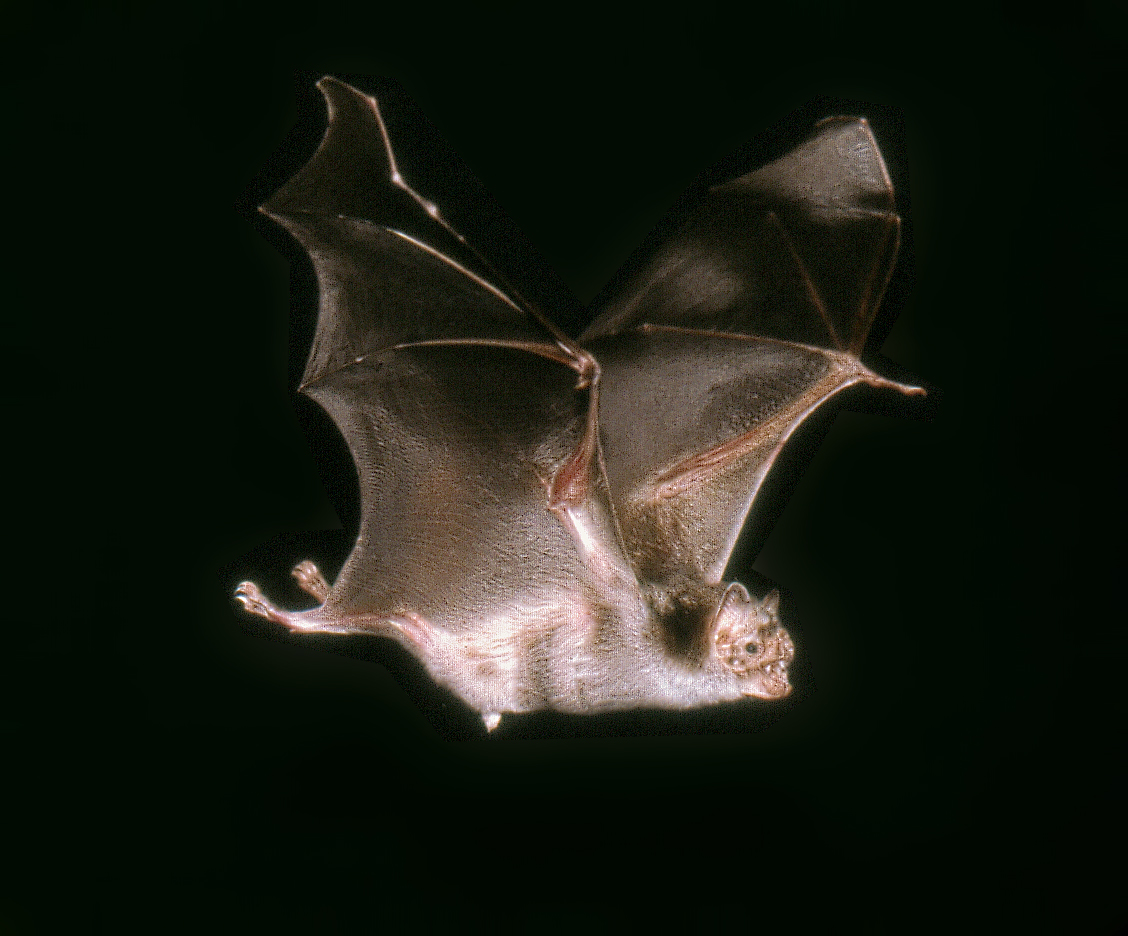

Conservation status
- Least Concern (IUCN 3.1)

Scientific classification
- Kingdom: Animalia
- Phylum: Chordata
- Class: Mammalia
- Infraclass: Placentalia
- Order: Chiroptera
- Family: Phyllostomidae
- Genus: Desmodus
- Species: D. rotundus

Binomial name
- Desmodus rotundus (Geoffroy, 1810)
- Common vampire bat range

= Common vampire bat =

Species of bat native to the Americas

The common vampire bat (Desmodus rotundus) is a small, leaf-nosed bat native to the Americas. It is one of three extant species of vampire bats, the other two being the hairy-legged and the white-winged vampire bats.

The common vampire bat practices hematophagy, mainly feeding on the blood of livestock. The bat usually approaches its prey at night while they are sleeping. It then uses its razor-sharp teeth to cut open the skin of its hosts and lap up their blood with its long tongue. The species is highly polygynous, and dominant adult males defend groups of females. It is one of the most social of bat species with a number of cooperative behaviors such as social grooming and food sharing. Because it feeds on livestock and is a carrier of rabies, the common vampire bat is considered a pest. Its conservation status is categorized as least concern by the International Union for Conservation of Nature because of "its wide distribution, presumed large population tolerance of a degree of habitat modification, and because it is unlikely to be declining at nearly the rate required to qualify for listing in a threatened category."

== Taxonomy ==
The common vampire bat was first described as Phyllostoma rotundum by Étienne Geoffroy Saint-Hilaire in 1810. Another description was published in 1826 as a new species Desmodus rufus by Maximilian Wied, in the second volume of his work detailing his explorations in Brazil, erecting a new genus Desmodus. The species received several scientific names before being given its current one—Desmodus rotundus—by Oldfield Thomas in 1901. It is classified under the subfamily Desmodontinae along with two other species: the hairy-legged vampire bat (Diphylla ecaudata) and the white-winged vampire bat (Diaemus youngi). These three species compose the "true" vampire bats, as opposed to the "false" vampires of the family Megadermatidae and the spectral bat. All three species of Desmodontinae specialize in feeding on the blood of warm-blooded animals. However, the common vampire bat feeds on mammalian blood more than the other two species, which primarily feed on that of birds. The three species resemble each other, but the common vampire bat can be distinguished by its longer thumb. It is the only extant member of its genus, although other fossil species have been described. It has a haploid number of 14, for a karyotype of 28 chromosomes.

A description published under the name Desmodus puntajudensi (Cuban vampire bat) by Woloszyn and Mayo in 1974 was later recognized as synonymous with this species.

== Physical description ==
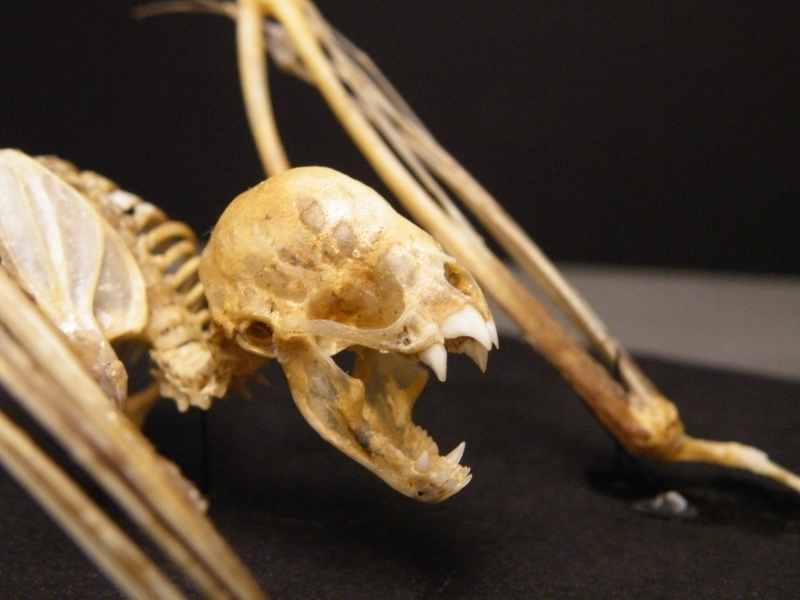
Skeleton

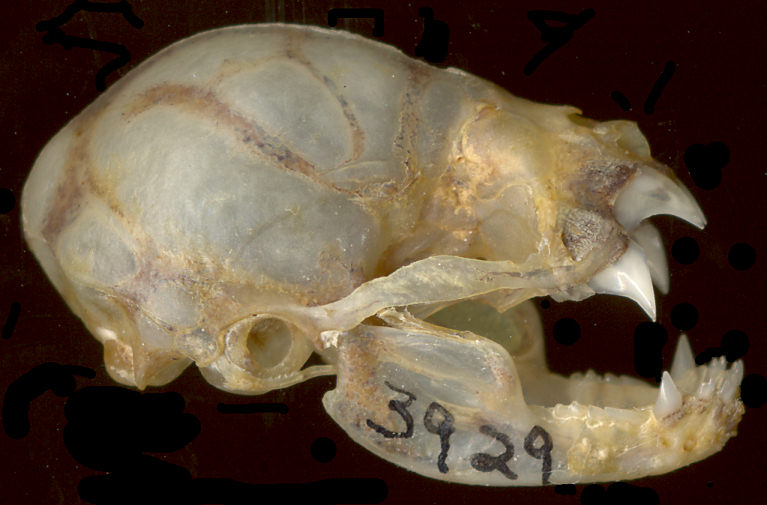
Skull

The common vampire bat is short-haired, with silver-gray fur on its undersides, demarcated from the darker fur on its back. It has a deeply grooved lower lip, and a flat, leaf-shaped nose. A well-developed, clawed thumb on each wing is used to climb onto prey and to assist the animal in take-off. The bat averages about 9 cm (3.5 in) long with a wingspan of 18 cm (7 in). It commonly weighs about 25–40 grams (2 oz), but its weight can drastically increase after a single feeding. The braincase is relatively large, but the snout is reduced to accommodate large incisors and canines. It has the fewest teeth among bats. The upper incisors lack enamel, which keeps them razor-sharp. Its dental formula is 1.1.2.01.1.3.0, for a total of 18 teeth.

While most other bats have almost completely lost the ability to maneuver on land, vampire bats are an exception. They can run using a unique, bounding gait in which the forelimbs are used instead of the hindlimbs to propel forward, as the wings are much more powerful than the legs. This ability likely evolved independently within the bat lineage. Three pads under the thumb function like a sole. It is also capable of leaping in various directions, heights, and distances. When making a jump, the bat pushes up with its pectoral limbs. The hindlimbs keep the body over the pectoral limbs which are stabilized by the thumbs.

Common vampire bats have good eyesight. They are able to distinguish different optical patterns and may use vision for long-range orientation. These bats also have well-developed senses of smell and hearing: the cochlea is highly sensitive to low-frequency acoustics, and the nasal passages are relatively large. They emit echolocation signals orally, and thus fly with their mouths open for navigation. They can identify a metal strip 1 centimetre (0.39 in) wide at a distance of 50 centimetres (20 in), which is moderate compared to other bats.

== Range and habitat ==
The common vampire bat is found in parts of Mexico, Central America, and South America, as well as the Caribbean islands of Margarita and Trinidad. They can be found as far north as 280 kilometres (170 mi) south of the Mexico–United States border. Fossils of this species have been found in Florida and states bordering Mexico. The common vampire is the most common bat species in southeastern Brazil. The southern extent of its range is Uruguay, northern Argentina, and central Chile. In the West Indies, the bat is only found on Trinidad. It prefers warm and humid climates, and uses tropical and subtropical woodlands and open grasslands for foraging. Bats roost in trees, caves, abandoned buildings, old wells, and mines. Vampire bats will roost with about 45 other bat species, and tend to be the most dominant at roosting sites. They occupy the darkest and highest places in the roosts; when they leave, other bat species move in to take over these vacated spots.

== Behavior ==
=== Feeding ===
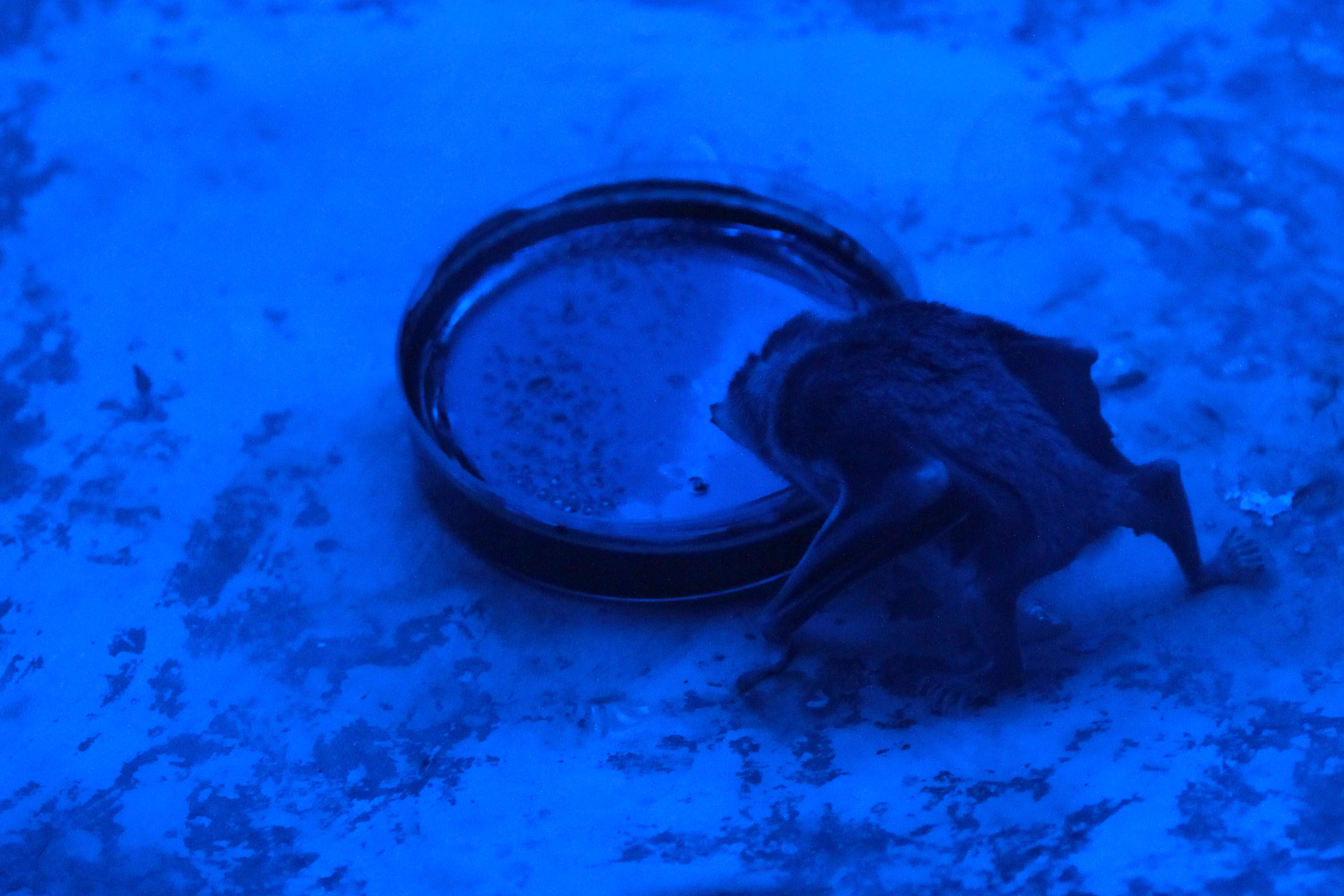
A vampire bat drinking at the Buffalo Zoo.

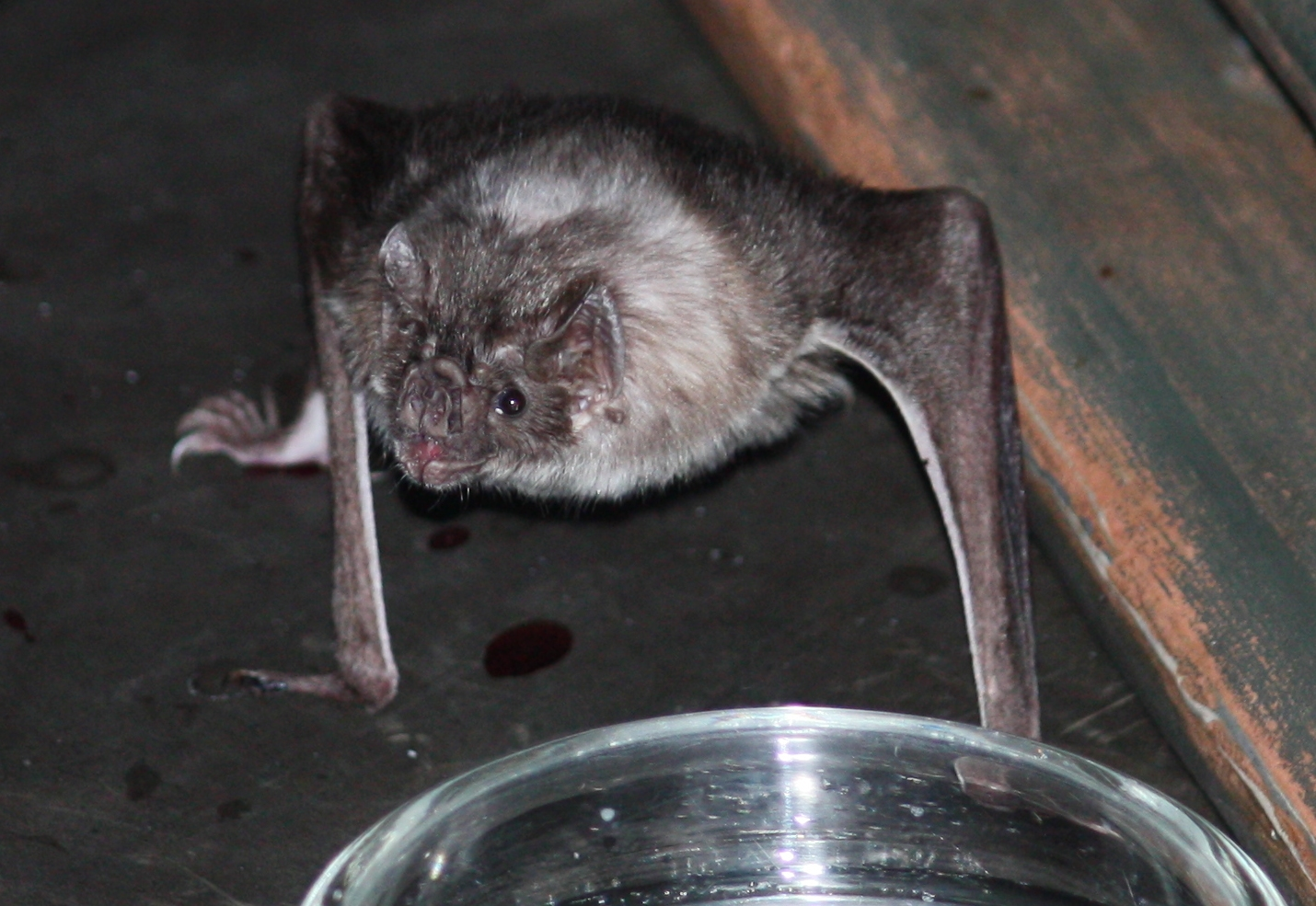
A vampire bat at the Louisville Zoo.

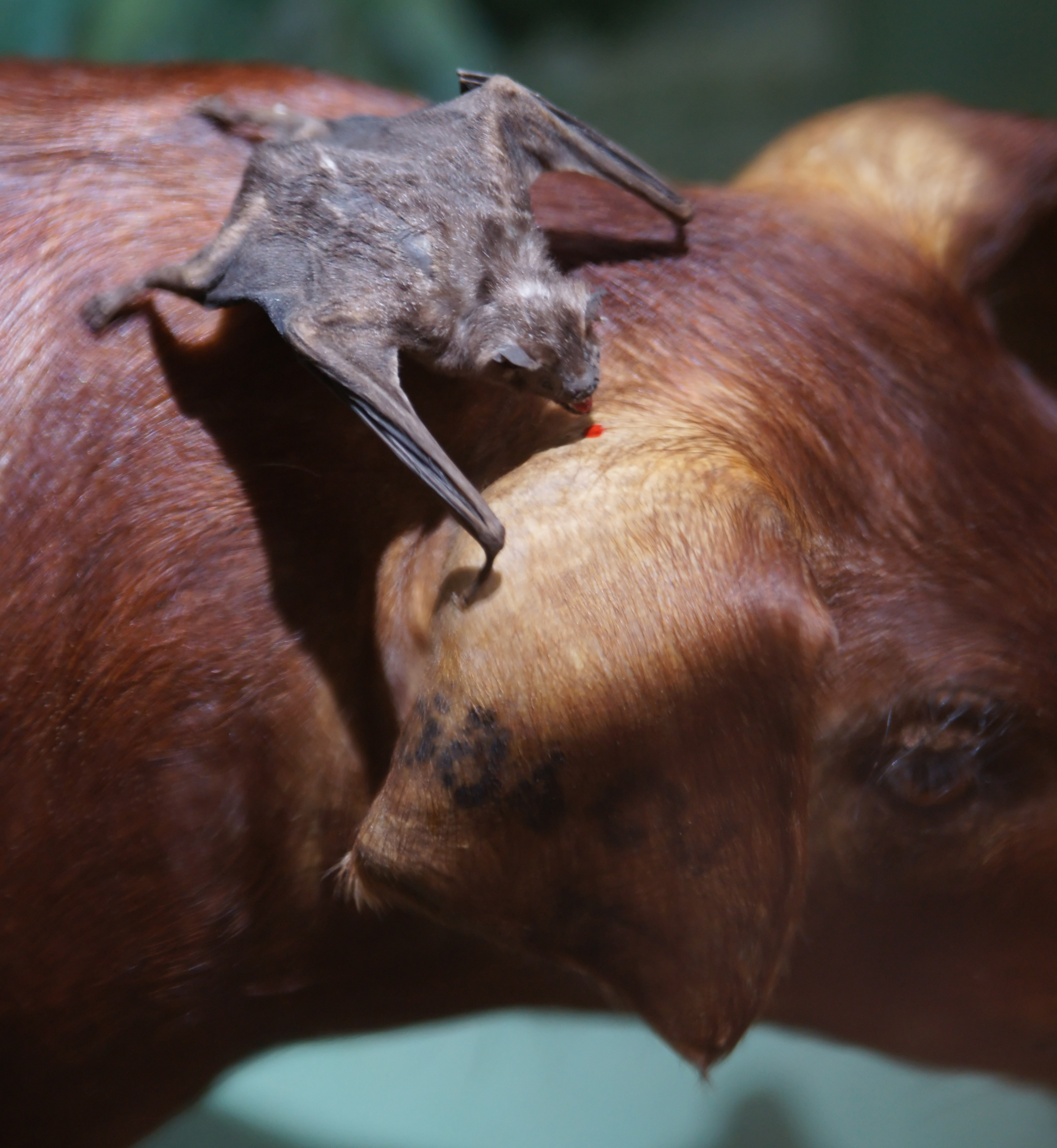
Common vampire bat feeding on a cow calf (taxidermy specimens).

The common vampire bat feeds primarily on mammalian blood, particularly that of livestock such as cattle and horses. Vampire bats feed on wild prey like the tapir, but seem to prefer domesticated animals, and favor horses over cattle when given the choice.

Vampire bats hunt at night, using echolocation and olfaction to track down prey. They feed in a distance of 5 to 8 km (3.1 to 5.0 mi) from their roosts. When a bat selects a target, it lands on it, or jumps up onto it from the ground, usually targeting the rump, flank, or neck of its prey; heat sensors in the nose help it to detect blood vessels near the surface of the skin. It pierces the animal's skin with its teeth, biting away a small flap, and laps up the blood with its tongue, which has lateral grooves adapted to this purpose. The blood is kept from clotting by an anticoagulant in the saliva known as Draculin (named after Count Dracula).

They are protective of their host and will fend off other bats while feeding. It is uncommon for two or more bats to feed on the same host, with the exception of mothers and their offspring.

=== Mating and reproduction ===
A colony of vampire bats

Male vampire bats guard roosting sites that attract females, but females often switch roosts.

During estrus, a female releases one egg. Mating usually lasts three to four minutes; the male bat mounts the female from the posterior end, grasps her back with his teeth, holds down her folded wings, and inseminates her. Vampire bats are reproductively active year-round, although the number of conceptions and births peak in the rainy season. Females give birth to one offspring per pregnancy, following a gestation period of about seven months. The young are raised primarily by the females. Mothers leave their young to hunt, and call their young to feed upon returning. The young accompany their mothers to hunt at six months, but are not fully weaned until nine months. Female offspring usually remain in their natal groups into adulthood, unless their mothers die or move. The occasional movements of unrelated females between groups leads to the formation of multiple matrilines within groups. Male offspring tend to live in their natal groups until they are one to two years old, sometimes being forced out by the resident adult males.

=== Cooperation ===
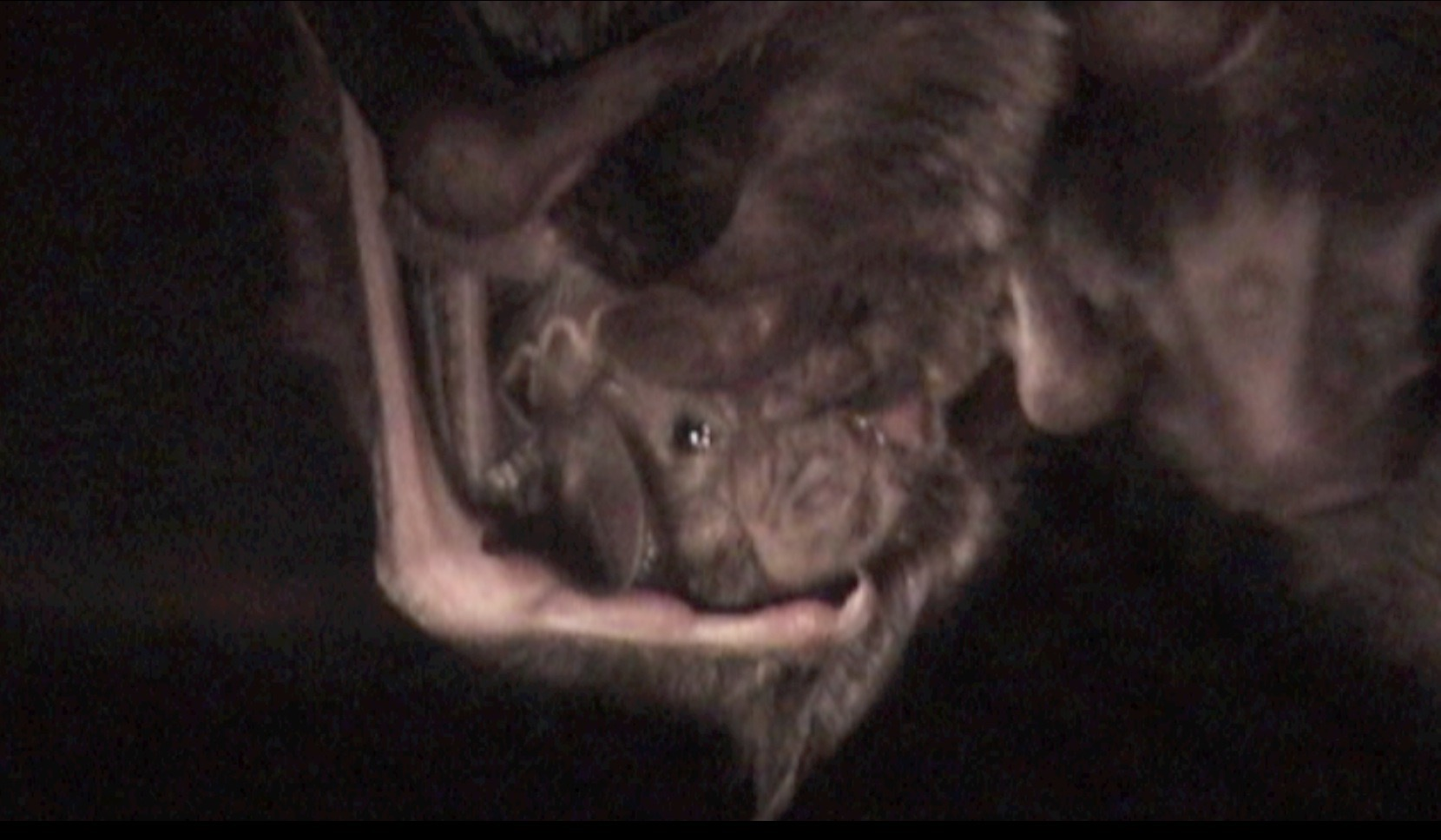
Vampire bats sharing food

Regurgitated food sharing in common vampire bats has been studied in both the lab and field, and is predicted by kinship, association, and reciprocal help. In a field study conducted in Costa Rica from 1978 to 1983, vampire bats frequently switched between several roost trees and co-roosted with kin and non-kin. Mean genetic kinship within roosting groups was low (r = 0.03−0.11), but 95% of food sharing observed in the wild occurred between close kin (first cousins or higher). Most observed food sharing (70%) was mothers feeding their pups. The non-maternal sharing events were kin-biased suggesting that vampire bats prefer to help relatives. However, non-maternal food sharing is even better explained by frequency of interaction, even after controlling for kinship. Food sharing was only observed when the co-roosting association was greater than 60%. Food sharing appears to require social bonds that require development over long periods of time. Among familiar bats, the amount of food given from bat A to bat B is best predicted by the amount of food given from bat B to A. Reciprocal sharing is most obvious over longer time spans as found in primate cooperation.

Vampire bats also participate in mutual grooming; two bats groom each other simultaneously to clean one another, and to strengthen social bonds. Bats that groom one another also share food. It was suggested that while grooming, a bat might assess the size of its partner's abdomen to determine if it really needs to eat.

== Relationship with humans ==
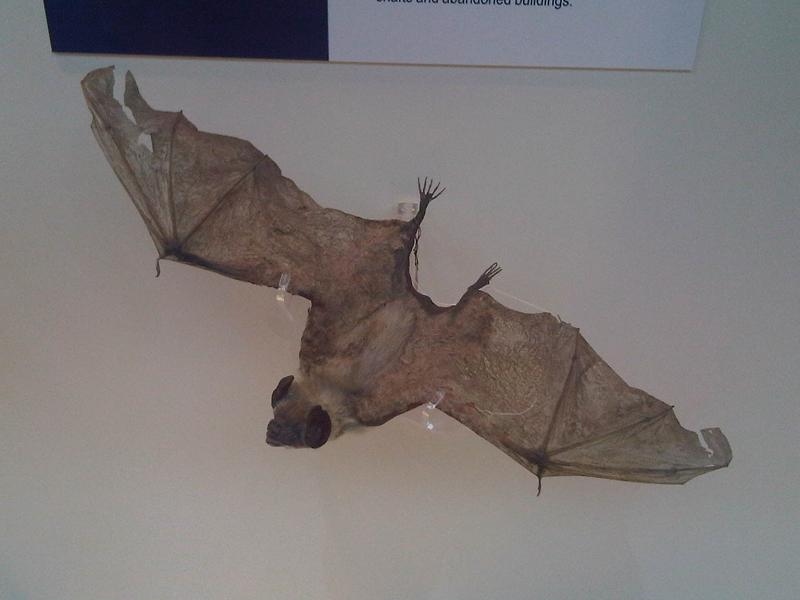
Taxidermied bat on display

The highest occurrence of rabies in vampire bats occurs in the large populations found in South America. The danger is not so much to the human population, but rather to livestock. Joseph Lennox Pawan, a government bacteriologist in Trinidad, found the first infected vampire bat in March 1932. He soon proved various species of bat, including the common vampire bat, are capable of transmitting rabies for an extended period of time without artificial infection or external symptoms. Fruit bats of the genus Artibeus were later shown to demonstrate the same abilities. During this asymptomatic stage, the bats continue to behave normally and breed. At first, Pawan's finding that bats transmitted rabies to people and animals were thought fantastic and were ridiculed.

Although most bats do not have rabies, those that do may be clumsy, disoriented, and unable to fly, which makes them more likely to come into contact with humans. There is evidence that it is possible for the rabies virus to infect a host purely through airborne transmission, without direct physical contact of the victim with the bat. Although one should not have an unreasonable fear of bats, one should avoid handling them or having them in one's living space, as with any wild animal. Medical attention should be given to any person who awakens to discover a vampire bat in their sleeping quarters. It is possible that young children may not fully awaken due to the presence of a bat (or its bite).

The unique properties of the vampire bats' saliva have found some positive use in medicine. A genetically engineered drug called desmoteplase, which uses the anticoagulant properties of the saliva of Desmodus rotundus, has been shown to increase blood flow in stroke patients.

== See also ==
- Chupacabra
- Hematophagy
- Peuchen
