= List of subspecies of Galápagos tortoise =

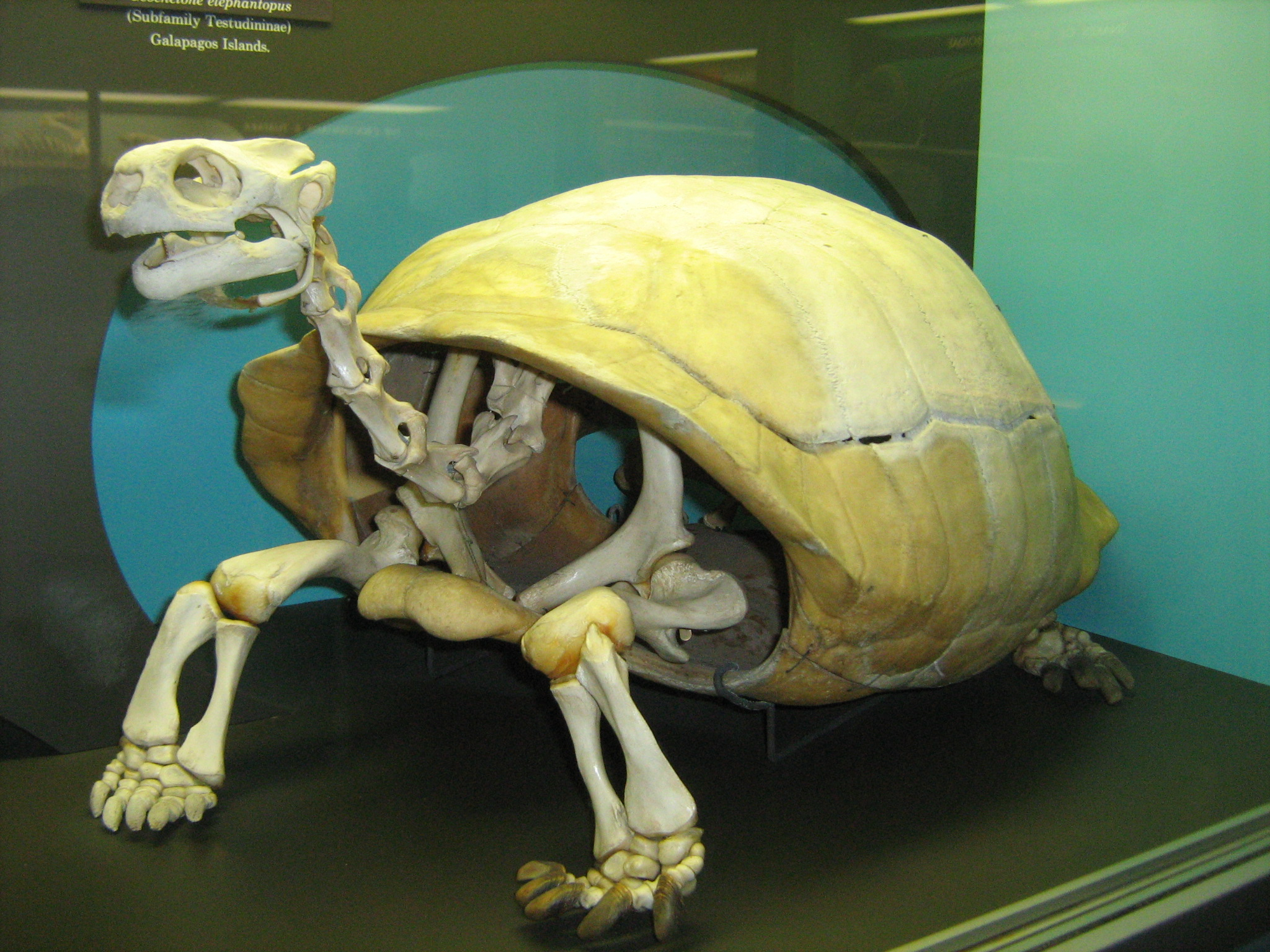
Chelonoidis niger vicina skeleton at the National Museum of Natural History in Washington, D.C.

Chelonoidis niger (the Galápagos tortoise) is a tortoise species endemic to the Galápagos Islands. It includes at least 14, and possibly up to 16, subspecies. Only 12 subspecies now exist: one on each of the islands of Santiago, San Cristóbal, Pinzón, Española, and Fernandina; two on Santa Cruz; one on each of the five main volcanoes of the largest island, Isabela (Wolf, Darwin, Alcedo, Sierra Negra, and Cerro Azul); and one, abingdoni from Pinta Island, which is considered extinct as of June 24, 2012. The subspecies inhabiting Floreana Island (Chelonoidis niger niger) is thought to have been hunted to extinction by 1850, only years after Charles Darwin's landmark visit of 1835 in which he saw carapaces but no live tortoises on the island; however, hybrid tortoises with C. n. niger ancestry still exist in the modern day.

Biological taxonomy is not fixed, and placement of taxa is reviewed as a result of new research. The current categorization of subspecies of Chelonoidis niger is shown below. Also included are synonyms, which are now discarded duplicate or incorrect namings. Common names are given but may vary, as they have no set meaning.

Prior to the 2000s, all members of this group were classified as subspecies in a single species, Chelonoidis niger. From the 2000s until 2021, the individual subspecies were instead classified as distinct species. However, a 2021 study analyzing the level of divergence within the extinct West Indian Chelonoidis radiation and comparing it to the Galápagos radiation found that the level of divergence within both clades may have been significantly overestimated, and supported once again reclassifying all Galápagos tortoises as subspecies of a single species, C. niger. This was followed by the Turtle Taxonomy Working Group and the Reptile Database later that year.

== List of subspecies ==
Chelonoidis niger
Subspecies	Authority	Description	Population and range
C. n. abingdonii (from Abingdon Island); Abingdon Island tortoise Conservation status Extinct	Günther 1877. The holotype of C. n. ephippium (Günther 1875) is a misidentified C. abingdoni, so technically abingdoni is a junior synonym.	Lonesome George, the last living member of the subspecies, died on June 24, 2012. This subspecies was severely depleted by whalers and fishermen, and the introduction of goats in 1958 resulted in massive destruction of vegetation. The carapace is saddle-backed, very narrow, compressed, and slightly upturned anteriorly, and wider and lower posteriorly with a rounded margin.	No known individuals. Formerly the southern slopes of Pinta (Abingdon) island, now extinct. In 2007, an Abingdon Island hybrid was found on Isabela Island, suggesting that there may still be a living Abingdon Island tortoise in the wild.
C. n. becki (named for Rollo Beck); Volcán Wolf tortoise Conservation status Vulnerable	Rothschild 1901	Reproduction is successful. Apparently two morphotypes occur on Volcán Wolf, domed and saddle-backed. A more flattened or dome-shelled population from the south may have crossed the former lava barrier and mixed with an isolated population of saddle-backed tortoises. For the saddle-backed variety, the gray carapace is relatively thick with little or no cervical indentation, the anterior carapacial rim upturned, and the posterior marginals flared and slightly serrated. The carapace is compressed or narrowed anteriorly, but not nearly as much as some other saddle-backed subspecies.	1,139 individuals. Northern Isabela (Albemarle) Island, northern and western slopes of Volcán Wolf. Recent research indicates that the variation is caused by hybridization of native Isabela tortoises with about 40 descendants of tortoises from Floreana, a population thought to be extinct since the 1850s.
C. n. chathamensis (from Chatham Island); Chatham Island tortoise Conservation status Endangered	Van Denburgh 1907	Heavily exploited and eliminated over much of its original range. Trampling of nests by feral donkeys, and the predation of hatchlings by feral dogs decimated populations, but the breeding program has led to successful releases. It has a wide, black shell, its shape intermediate between the saddle-backed and domed subspecies: adult males are rather saddle-backed, but females and young males are wider in the middle and more domed. A now-extinct, more flat-shelled form occurred throughout the wetter and higher regions of the island most altered by man when the island was colonized. The type specimen was from this extinct population, so it is possible that the subspecies currently designated C. chathamensis is mistakenly applied.	6,700 individuals. San Cristóbal (Chatham) island, confined to the northeast. Fencing of nests and dog eradication in the 1970s helped in the population recovery.
C. n. darwini (named for Charles Darwin); Santiago Island giant tortoise Conservation status Critically Endangered	Van Denburgh 1907	Large numbers of tortoises were removed from the island in the early 19th century by whaling vessels, and introduced goats reduced the coastal lowlands to deserts, restricting the remaining tortoises to the interior. The sex ratio is strongly imbalanced in favour of the males and most nests and young are destroyed by feral pigs. Some nests are now protected by lava corrals and since 1970, eggs have been transported to the Charles Darwin Research Station for hatching and rearing. Release programs and measures for nest protection from feral pigs have been successful. The gray to black carapace is intermediate in shape between the saddle-backed subspecies and the domed subspecies. It has only a shallow cervical indentation; the anterior carapacial rim is not appreciably upturned, and the posterior marginals are flared, slightly upturned, and slightly serrated.	1,165 individuals, though a strong male bias in the remaining population impedes a quick recovery of the population. Santiago (James) Island, west-central areas.
C. n. donfaustoi Eastern Santa Cruz Island tortoise Conservation status Critically Endangered	Poulakakis et al., 2015	MtDNA evidence shows that there are actually three genetically distinct populations on Santa Cruz Island. They are characterised by a black, oval carapace (to 130 cm) that is domed, higher in the centre than in the front, and broad anteriorly. In 2015, the small, eastern Cerro Fatal population of the island was described as a distinct subspecies, C. n. donfaustoi, most closely related to chathamensis (and forming a clade with it plus abingdoni and hoodensis), while the main southwestern porteri population was found to be closer to the Floreana and southern Isabela tortoises.	400 individuals, with 250 adults
C. n. duncanensis (from Duncan Island); Duncan Island tortoise Conservation status Vulnerable	Garman 1917 syn. ephippium (L. 'mounted as on a horse, saddlelike') Günther 1875. The holotype of C. n. ephippium is a misidentified C. abingdoni. The previous nomen nudum for the taxon, duncanensis was therefore resurrected.	Although relatively undisturbed by whalers, fairly large numbers of tortoises were removed by expeditions in the latter half of the 19th century and the early 20th. After the introduction of black rats (Rattus rattus) and brown rats (Rattus norvegicus) some time before 1900, no natural breeding succeeded. Since 1965, eggs have been transported to the Charles Darwin Research Station for hatching and rearing. Over 75% of those released between 1970 and 1990 survived. This saddle-backed subspecies is one of the smallest of the Galápagos tortoises. Its brownish-gray, oblong carapace has only a very shallow cervical indentation, the anterior marginals little to much upturned, and the slightly serrated posterior marginals flared and upturned. The carapace is usually compressed or narrowed anteriorly.	532 individuals (no longer extinct in the wild). Southwestern Pinzón (Duncan) Island.
C. n. guentheri (named for Albert Günther); Sierra Negra giant tortoise Conservation status Critically Endangered	Baur 1889	Severely depleted by settlement and exploitation for oil which continued until the 1950s. The wild reproduction is successful in the east, but in the western-southwestern area, rats, dogs, cats and pigs are present as predators. It is one of the most threatened of the existing subspecies, and 20 adults were taken into captivity for a breeding program in 1998 following the threat of a volcanic eruption from the nearby Cerro Azul volcano. The subspecies is intermediate in shape between domed and saddle-backed, with a distinctive 'tabletop' appearance.	704 individuals, as per a 2023 study. Isabela Island by the Sierra Negra volcano, one group in the east and another over the western and southwestern slopes. At least one authority has suggested merging C. n. vicina with C. n. microphyes, C. n. vandenburghi and C. n. guentheri as the southern Isabela tortoise (C. n. vicina), putting morphological differences down to geographic variation.
C. n. hoodensis (from Hood Island); Hood Island tortoise Conservation status Critically Endangered	Van Denburgh 1907	This population was very heavily exploited by whalers in the 19th century and collapsed around 1850. 13 adults were found in the early 1970s and held at the Charles Darwin Research Station as a breeding colony. The two males and 11 females were initially brought to the Darwin Station. Fortuitously, a third male (Diego) was discovered at the San Diego Zoo and joined the others in a captive breeding program. Mating had not occurred naturally for some time, because the individuals were so scattered that they did not meet. Following the successful captive breeding program, large numbers have been released back into the wild and are now breeding on their own.	3,000 individuals on Española (Hood) Island, others in captivity.
C. n. microphyes (L. 'small in stature'); Volcán Darwin tortoise Conservation status Endangered	Günther 1875	Heavily exploited in the 19th century by whaling vessels, but wild reproduction is successful. Has a brownish-gray, oval carapace, is intermediate between saddle-backed and domed and rather flattened.	818 individuals. Isabela Island, southern and western slopes of Volcán Darwin. At least one authority has suggested merging C. n. vicina with C. n. microphyes, C. n. vandenburghi and C. n. guentheri as the southern Isabela tortoise (C. n. vicina), putting morphological differences down to geographic variation.
C. n. niger (L. 'black'); Floreana Island giant tortoise Conservation status Extinct	Quoy and Gaimard 1824 syn. galapagoensis Baur 1889. This is the nominate subspecies.	Formerly abundant, but heavily exploited by visiting ships and a penal colony in the 20th century. Floreana Island suffered a devastating fire in 1820, set by a crewman from the whaler Essex. However, in 2008, research into mitochondrial DNA in museum specimens found some of the Floreana subspecies. Theoretically, a breeding program could be established to "resurrect" the pure Floreana subspecies from hybrids. Using marker-assisted selection for a captive breeding population, it is estimated that the project would last 100 years.	0 individuals: extinct. Possible hybrid subpopulation exists on Isabela. Recent research found more than 80 tortoise hybrids between native Isabela tortoises and pure C. n. niger, indicating that there might be about 38 pure descendants of tortoises from Floreana, perhaps transported there by whalers.
C. n. phantasticus (L. 'a product of fantasy'); Fernandina Island tortoise Conservation status Critically endangered, possibly extinct	Van Denburgh 1907	Originally known from only one male specimen collected by members of the 1906 California Academy of Sciences expedition. There were discoveries of putative tortoise droppings and cactus bite marks in 1964 and 2013, and an unconfirmed sighting in 2009. However, no confirmed live tortoises, or even remains, were found on Fernandina until the discovery of an elderly female in February 2019. The tortoise has been transferred to a breeding center for the purpose of conservation and genetic tests.	Only one confirmed individual, but others may still exist. Fernandina (Narborough) Island
C. n. porteri Western Santa Cruz Island tortoise Conservation status Critically Endangered	Rothschild 1903 syn. nigrita (L. 'black') Duméril and Bibron 1835. The IUCN follows the nomenclature of Pritchard, which determines that nigrita was a nomen dubium at the subspecific level and placed the taxon under C. niger.	Depleted by heavy exploitation for oil at least until the 1930s. Reproductive success severely hampered for many years by the presence of feral dogs and pigs, but breeding programs are steady. MtDNA evidence shows that there are actually three genetically distinct populations on Santa Cruz Island. They are characterised by a black, oval carapace (to 130 cm) that is domed, higher in the centre than in the front, and broad anteriorly. In 2015, the small, eastern Cerro Fatal population of the island was described as a distinct subspecies, C. n. donfaustoi, most closely related to chathamensis (and forming a clade with it plus abingdoni and hoodensis), while the main southwestern porteri population was found to be closer to the Floreana and southern Isabela tortoises.	3,391 individuals. Santa Cruz (Indefatigable) Island. The main population occurs in the southwest with smaller populations in the northwest and east.
Chelonoidis 'Santa Fe Island lineage' (undescribed); Santa Fe Island tortoise Extinct	N/A	There have been accounts of whalers removing tortoises from Santa Fe Island, and two informants to the 1905-1905 California Academy of Sciences expedition mention locals removing tortoises in 1876 and 1890. These accounts, however, were given 30 and 15 years, respectively, after the incidents. The expedition found and collected old bones but no shell fragments, the most durable part of a tortoise skeleton. However, a genetic analyses of the bone fragments recovered by the expeditions supported the Santa Fe tortoise being a valid subspecies closely related to C. n. hoodensis. C. n. hoodensis have since been introduced to the island to recover the lost ecological function of the Santa Fe taxon.	No known individuals. Formerly Santa Fe Island.
C. n. vandenburghi (named for John Van Denburgh); Volcán Alcedo tortoise Conservation status Vulnerable	DeSola 1930	The largest population in the archipelago; wild reproduction is successful. It has a domed, black carapace.	6,320 individuals (by far the most numerous population). Central Isabela Island on the caldera and southern slopes of Volcán Alcedo. At least one authority has suggested merging C. n. vicina with C. n. microphyes, C. n. vandenburghi and C. n. guentheri as the southern Isabela tortoise (C. n. vicina), putting morphological differences down to geographic variation.
C. n. vicina (L. 'near'); Iguana Cove tortoise Conservation status Endangered	Günther 1875 syn. elephantopus	Range overlaps with C. n. guentheri. This population was depleted by seamen in the last 200 years and by extensive slaughter in the late 1950s and 1960s by employees of cattle companies based at Iguana Cove. It has a thick, heavy shell intermediate between saddle-backed and domed, and not appreciably narrowed anteriorly. Males are larger and more saddle-backed; females are more domed. Until eradication programs, virtually all nests and hatchlings were destroyed by black rats, pigs, dogs, and cats.	Around 5,275 individuals, as per a 2023 study. Isabela Island's Cerro Azul volcano, range may overlap with that of C. n. guentheri. At least one authority has suggested merging C. n. vicina with C. n. microphyes, C. n. vandenburghi and C. n. guentheri as the southern Isabela tortoise (C. n. vicina), putting morphological differences down to geographical variation.

== Disputed subspecies ==
Disputed Geochelone niger subspecies
Species	Authority	Description	Range and population
C. n. wallacei Rábida Island tortoise	Rothschild 1902	The Reptile Database considers it conspecific with C. n. guntheri.	Rabida Island (purportedly)
