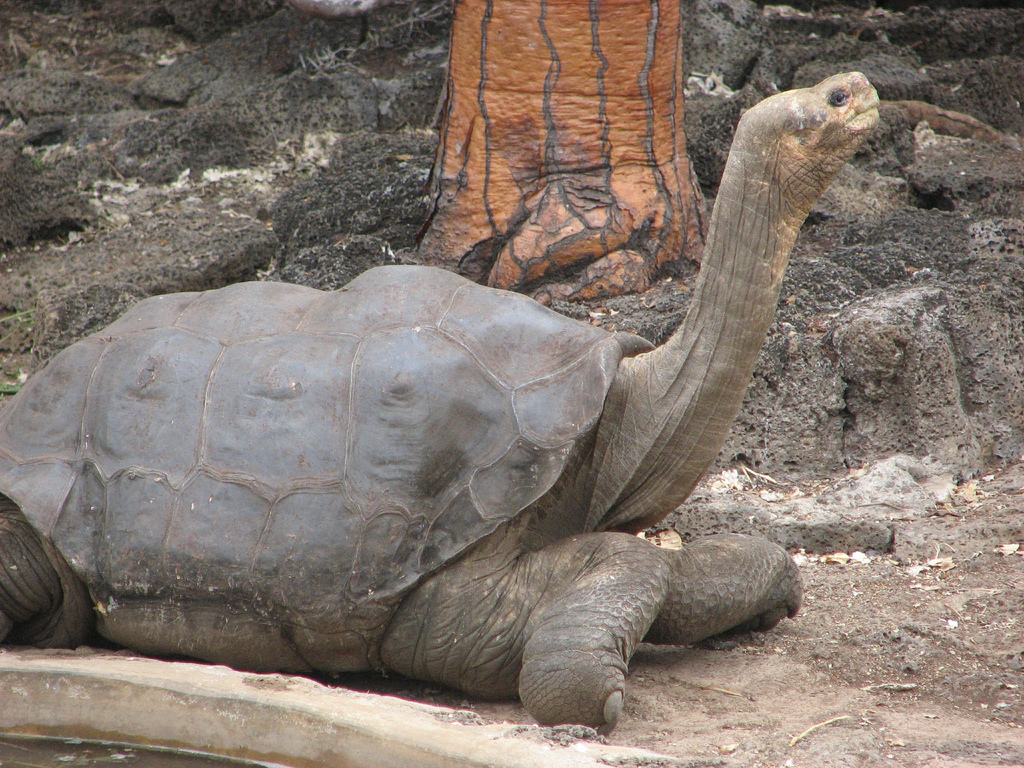
- Lonesome George at the Charles Darwin Research Station in 2006, the last known individual of his species of Galápagos tortoise

Conservation status
- Extinct (2012) (IUCN 3.1)

Scientific classification
- Kingdom: Animalia
- Phylum: Chordata
- Class: Reptilia
- Order: Testudines
- Suborder: Cryptodira
- Family: Testudinidae
- Genus: Chelonoidis
- Species: C. niger
- Subspecies: †C. n. abingdonii

Trinomial name
- †Chelonoidis niger abingdonii (Günther, 1877)
- Map of the Galápagos Islands showing locations of different tortoise species.

Synonyms
- Testudo abingdonii Günther, 1877; Testudo elephantopus abingdonii Mertens & Wermuth, 1955; Geochelone elephantopus abingdonii Pritchard, 1967; Geochelone nigra abingdonii Iverson, 1992; Geochelone abingdonii Valverde, 2004

= Pinta Island tortoise =

Subspecies of Galápagos tortoise

The Pinta Island tortoise (Chelonoidis niger abingdonii)), also known as the Pinta giant tortoise, Abingdon Island tortoise, or Abingdon Island giant tortoise, is a recently extinct subspecies of Galápagos tortoise that was native to Ecuador's Pinta Island.

The subspecies was described by Albert Günther in 1877 after specimens arrived in London. By the end of the 19th century, most of the Pinta Island tortoises had been wiped out due to hunting. By the mid-20th century, the subspecies was assumed to be extinct until a single male was discovered on the island in 1971. Efforts were made to mate the male, named Lonesome George, with other subspecies, but no viable eggs resulted. Lonesome George died on 24 June 2012, and the subspecies was believed to have become extinct with his death. However, 17 first-generation hybrids were reported in 2012 from Wolf Volcano on Isabela Island during a trip by Yale University researchers. As these specimens were juveniles, their parents might still be alive. The subspecies is classified as extinct on the IUCN Red List.

== Taxonomy ==
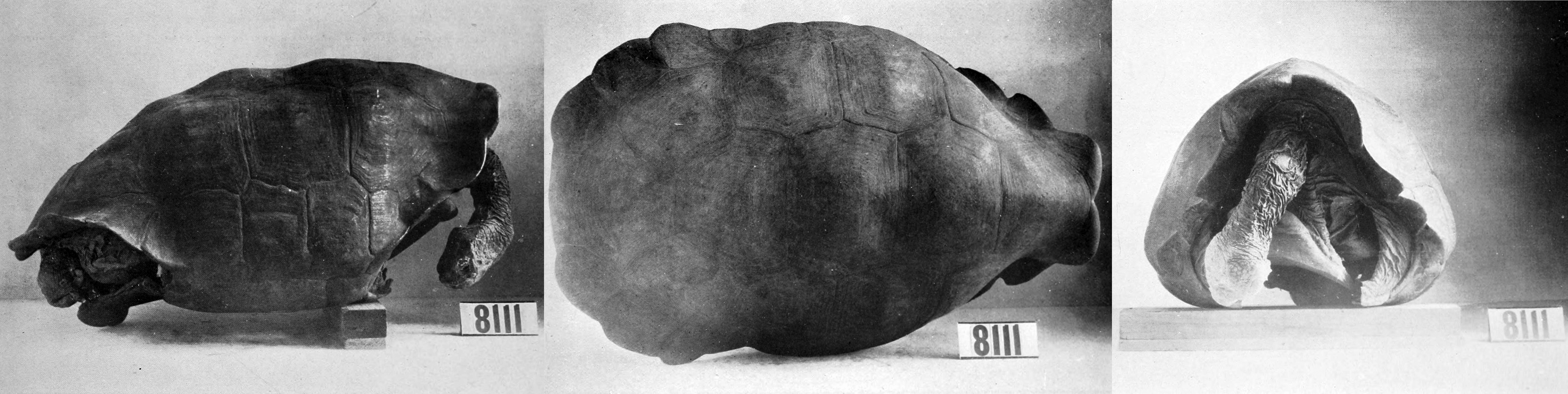
Dead specimen collected in 1905–1906

Lonesome George, along with other of the tortoises on Pinta Island, belonged to a species of 15 subspecies. Giant tortoises were once found on all of the continents except Australia and Antarctica. The Galápagos tortoises remain the largest living tortoises.

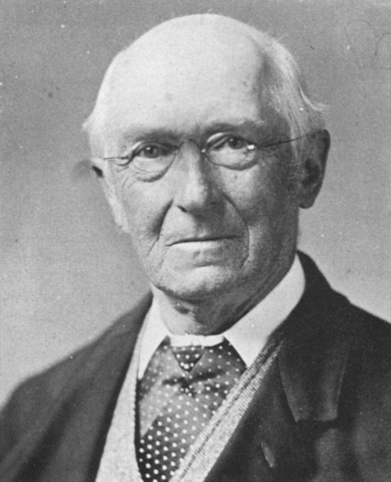
Albert Günther, who described Testudo abingdonii in 1877

The Pinta Island tortoise was originally described in 1877 by German-born British herpetologist Albert Günther, who named it Testudo abingdonii in his book The Gigantic Land-tortoises (Living and Extinct) in the Collection of the British Museum. The name abingdonii derives from Abingdon Island, now more commonly known as Pinta Island. The knowledge of its existence was derived from short statements of the voyages of Captain James Colnett in 1798 and Basil Hall in 1822. In 1876, Commander William Cookson brought three male specimens (along with other subspecies of Galápagos tortoise) to London aboard the Royal Navy ship HMS Peterel.

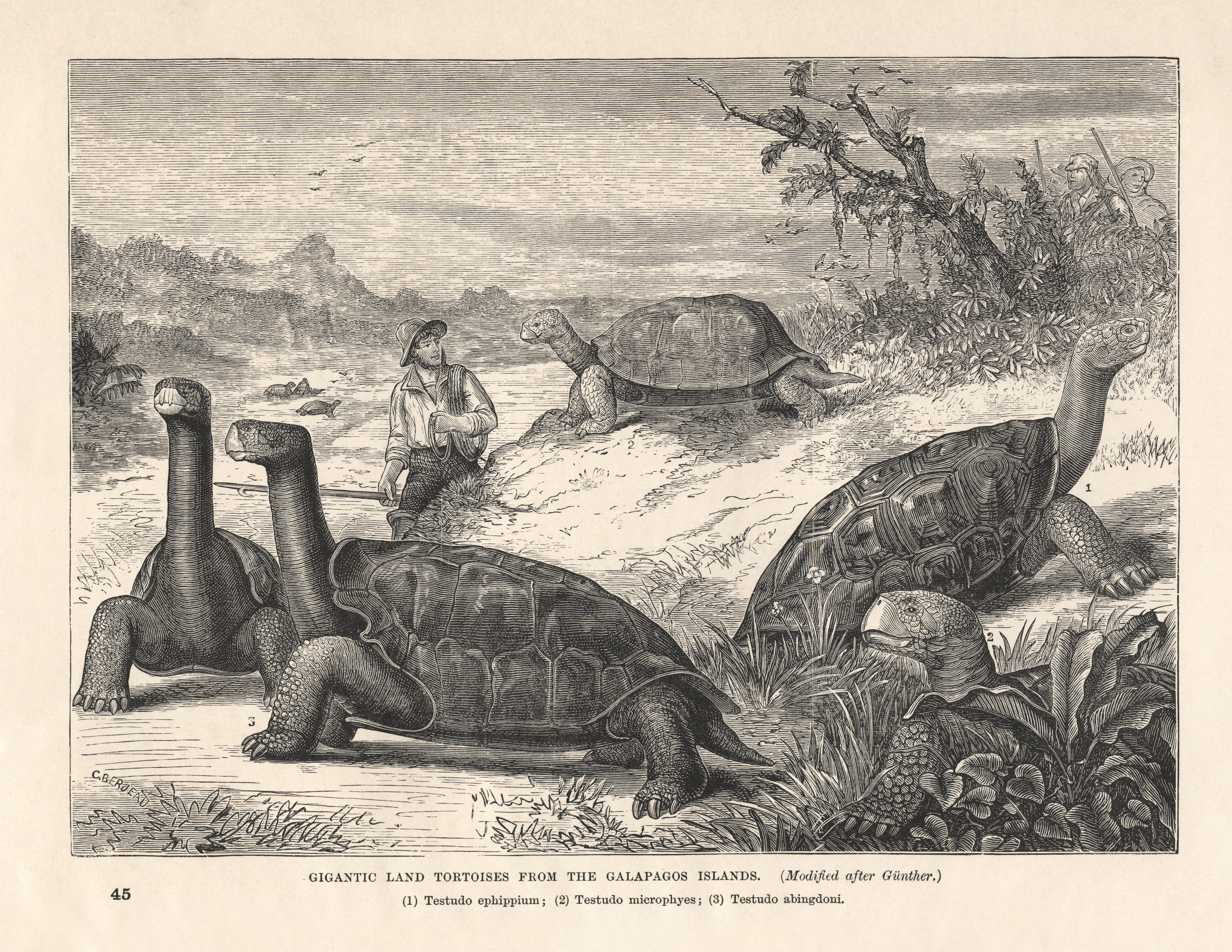
Charles Darwin depicted in an engraving with three species of Galápagos tortoises, including C. abingdonii (Cassell's Natural History, 1878)

Synonyms of Chelonoidis abingdonii include Testudo abingdonii Günther, 1877; Testudo elephantopus abingdonii Mertens & Wermuth, 1955; Geochelone elephantopus abingdonii Pritchard, 1967; Geochelone nigra abingdonii Iverson, 1992; and Geochelone abingdonii Valverde, 2004.

=== Evolution ===
The Galápagos tortoise is most closely related to the three living species of tortoise found on the South American mainland, which make up the genus Chelonoidis. Multiple phylogenetic studies support its closest living relative being the Chaco tortoise (C. chilensis), the southernmost distributed species of the genus.

The ancestral population of C. niger was thought to have split into the 15 different subspecies approximately 1.27-1.79 million years ago (Mya). Phylogenetic analysis of mitchondrial genomes of the extant subspecies (as well as the now-extinct C. n. abingdonii and C. n. niger) supports the hypothesis that the species progressively diverged as it colonized the islands, with the most recent divergences occurring furthest from the mainland on Isabela Island.

Curiously, repeated analyses suggest that the closest relative of the Pinta Island tortoise is the Española Island subspecies C. n. hoodensis, which is the most geographically distant population from Pinta Island. Despite the long journey of founder individuals, this colonization (approximately 0.25 Mya) was likely facilitated by northwest-traveling ocean currents.

== Behaviour and ecology ==
In the wild, Galápagos tortoises, including the Pinta Island subspecies, rested about 16 hours a day. Galápagos tortoises are herbivores, they fed primarily on greens, grasses, native fruit, and cactus pads. They drank large quantities of water, which they could store in their bodies for long periods of time for later use. They can reportedly survive up to six months without food or water.

For breeding, the tortoises were most active during the hot season (January to May). During the cool season (June to November), female tortoises migrated to nesting zones to lay their eggs.

Galápagos giant tortoises represent the top herbivores in the Galápagos, and as such they shape the entire island ecosystem. They provide critical ecosystem services by dispersing seeds and by acting as ecological engineers through herbivory and nutrient cycling. The extinction of the Pinta Island tortoise has diminished the functioning of the island ecosystem.

== Relationship with humans ==
=== Threats and conservation ===
Several of the surviving subspecies of Galápagos tortoises are endangered. The decline of the population began in the 17th century as a result of visits by buccaneers and whalers. They hunted tortoises as a source of fresh meat, taking about 200,000 tortoises altogether.

In 1958, goats were brought to Pinta Island and began eating much of the vegetation, to the detriment of the natural habitat. A prolonged effort to exterminate the goats was begun. As the goat populations declined, the vegetation recovered. Small trees began regenerating from the stumps left by the goats. Highland shrub subspecies, forest tree seedlings, Opuntia cactus, and other endemic subspecies increased. In 2003, Pinta Island was declared goat-free.

In addition to conservation efforts such as the elimination of goat populations in the Galápagos, there has been an effort to revive a number of subspecies of Galápagos tortoise through captive breeding. Future efforts may aim to recreate a population genetically similar to the original Pinta Island tortoise by breeding the first-generation hybrids discovered on Wolf Volcano.

=== Lonesome George ===
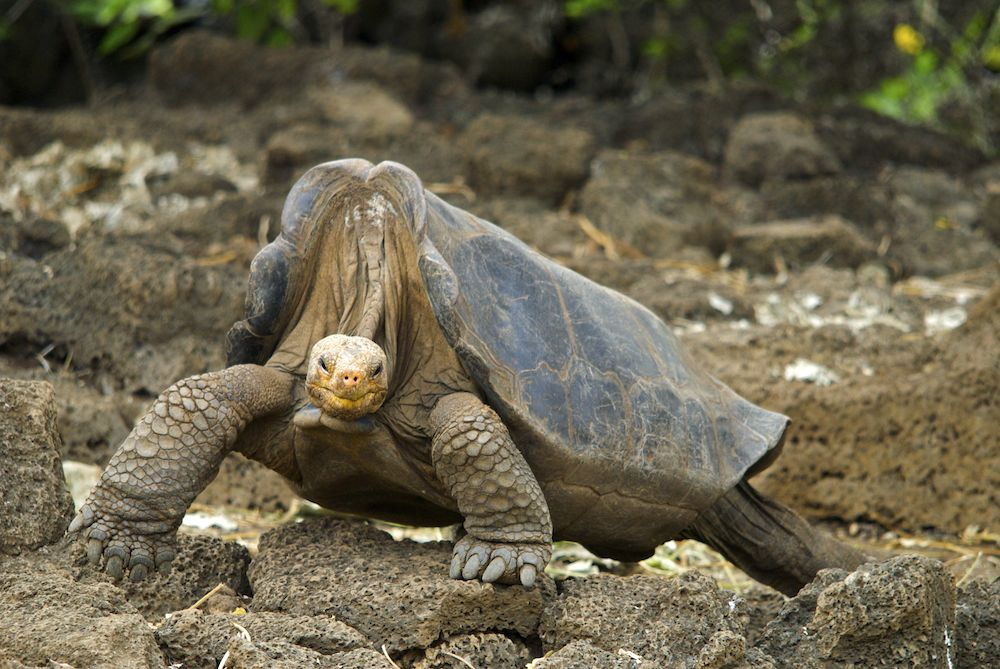
Lonesome George, the last known member of the species, in 2008

The last known individual of the subspecies was a male named Lonesome George (Spanish: El Solitario Jorge), who died on 24 June 2012. In his last years, he was known as the rarest creature in the world. George served as a potent symbol for conservation efforts in the Galápagos and internationally.

George was first seen on the island of Pinta on 1 December 1971 by Hungarian malacologist József Vágvölgyi. Relocated for his safety to the Charles Darwin Research Station on Santa Cruz Island, George was penned with two females of different subspecies. Although the females laid eggs, none hatched. The Pinta tortoise was pronounced functionally extinct.

Over the decades, all attempts at mating Lonesome George were unsuccessful, possibly because his subspecies was not cross-fertile with the other subspecies.

On 24 June 2012, at 8:00 am local time, Director of the Galápagos National Park Edwin Naula announced that Lonesome George had been found dead by his caretaker of 40 years, Fausto Llerena. Naula suspects that the cause of death was heart failure consistent with the end of the natural life of a tortoise.

Giant tortoises are among the longest-lived vertebrate animals (more than 100 years by some estimates) and have been used as a model for providing insight into longevity. DNA analysis of the genomes of Lonesome George and the Aldabra giant tortoise Aldabrachelys gigantea led to the detection of lineage-specific variants affecting DNA repair genes that might contribute to man's understanding of increased lifespans.

=== Possible remaining individuals ===
In 2006, Peter Pritchard, one of the world's foremost authorities on Galápagos tortoises, suggested that a male tortoise residing in the Prague Zoo might be a Pinta Island tortoise due to his shell structure. Subsequent DNA analysis, however, revealed that he was more likely to be from Pinzón Island, home of the Pinzón Island giant tortoise subspecies.

Whalers and pirates in the past used Isabela Island, the central and largest of the Galápagos Islands, as a tortoise dumping ground. Today, the remaining tortoises that live around Wolf Volcano have combined genetic markers from several subspecies.

In May 2007, analysis of genomic microsatellites (DNA sequences) suggested that individuals from a translocated group of C. abingdonii may still exist in the wild on Isabela. Researchers identified one male tortoise from the Wolf Volcano region that had half its genes in common with George's subspecies. This animal is believed to be a first-generation hybrid between the subspecies of the islands Isabela and Pinta. This suggests the possibility of a pure Pinta tortoise among the 2,000 tortoises on Isabela.

The identification of eight individuals of mixed ancestry among only 27 individuals sampled (estimated Volcano Wolf population size 1,000–2,000)… suggests the need to mount an immediate and comprehensive survey… to search for additional individuals of Pinta ancestry.

A subsequent trip to Isabela by Yale University researchers found 17 first-generation hybrids living at Wolf Volcano. The researchers planned to return to Isabela in the spring of 2013 to look for surviving Pinta tortoises and to try to collect hybrids in an effort to start a captive selective-breeding program and to hopefully reintroduce Pintas back to their native island.

In 2020, the Galápagos national park and Galápagos Conservancy announced that they had discovered one young female with a direct line of descent from the Chelonoidis abingdonii subspecies of Pinta island.

== See also ==
- Holocene extinction
- List of subspecies of Galápagos tortoise
