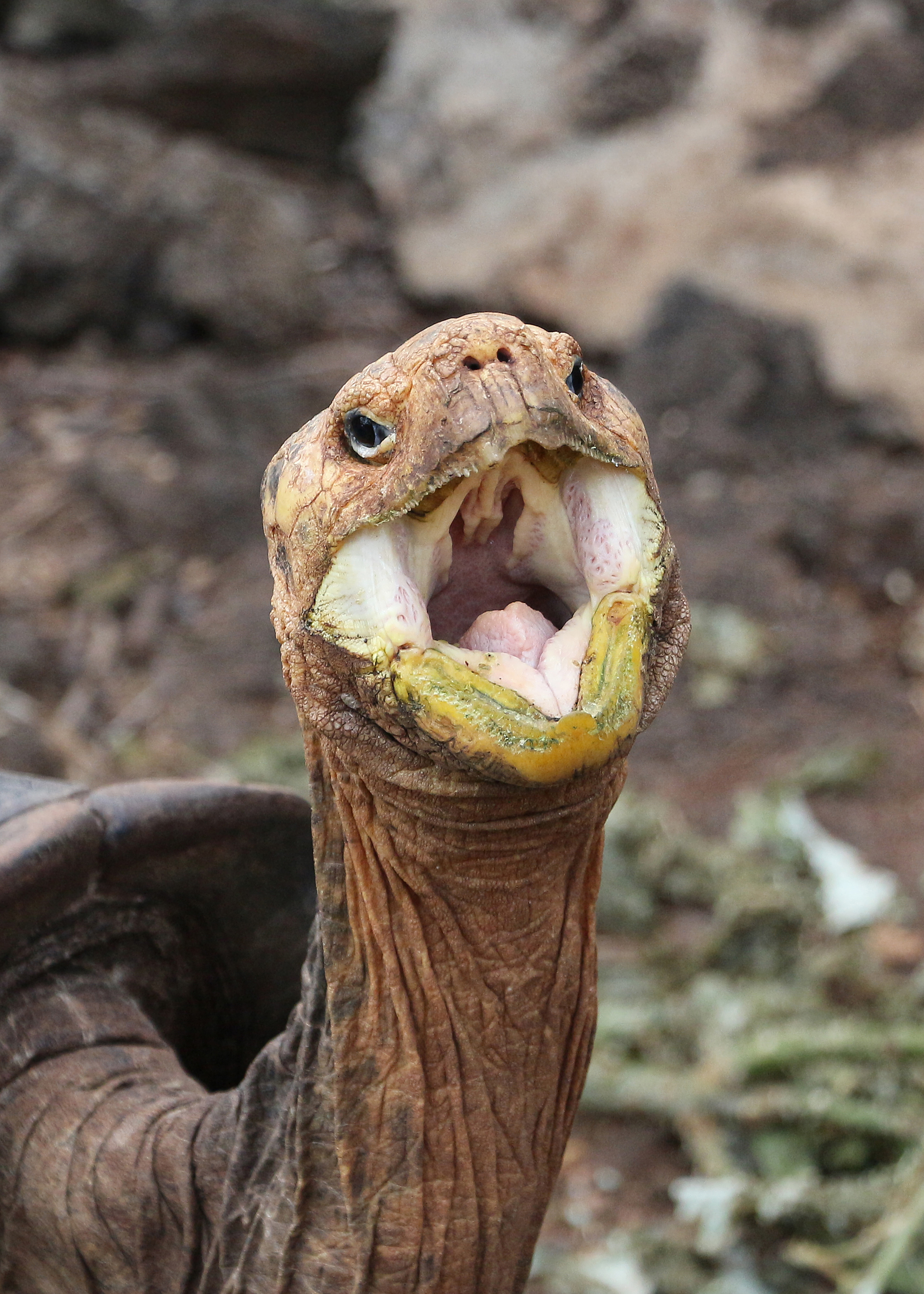
- Chelonoidis vicina at the Charles Darwin Research Station on Santa Cruz Island

Conservation status
- Endangered (IUCN 3.1)
- CITES Appendix I

Scientific classification
- Kingdom: Animalia
- Phylum: Chordata
- Class: Reptilia
- Order: Testudines
- Suborder: Cryptodira
- Family: Testudinidae
- Genus: Chelonoidis
- Species: C. niger
- Subspecies: C. n. vicina

Trinomial name
- Chelonoidis niger vicina (Günther, 1875)

Synonyms
- Testudo vicina Günther, 1875; Geochelone nigra vicina (Günther 1875); Testudo microphyes Günther, 1875; Testudo guentheri Baur, 1889; Testudo macrophyes Garman, 1917; Testudo vandenburghi De Sola, 1930

= Chelonoidis niger vicina =

Cerro Azul giant tortoise

Subspecies of turtle

Chelonoidis niger vicina, commonly known as the Cerro Azul giant tortoise, Iguana Cove tortoise or the Isabela Island giant tortoise, is a subspecies of Galápagos tortoise endemic to Isabela Island in the Galápagos.

== Population history ==
This population was depleted by seamen in the last 200 years and by extensive slaughter in the late 1950s and 1960s by employees of cattle companies based at Iguana Cove. Their population is thought to overlap with Chelonoidis niger guentheri.

A 2023 population study conducted by the Galápagos Conservancy estimated the subspecies' population to be around 5275 individuals. This would make it the third most populous subspecies., behind C. vandenburghi and C. chathamensis.

== Description ==
It has a thick, heavy shell intermediate between saddle-backed and domed, and not appreciably narrowed anteriorly. Males are larger and more saddle-backed; females are more domed. Until eradication programs, virtually all nests and hatchlings were destroyed by black rats, pigs, dogs, and cats.
