= Galápagos turtle =

Galápagos turtle may refer to:

- Galápagos green turtle, the green sea turtle population found around the Galápagos Islands, sometimes considered to be a subspecies
- Galápagos tortoise, a large species of tortoise native to the Galápagos Islands

- Species of the Galápagos tortoises
