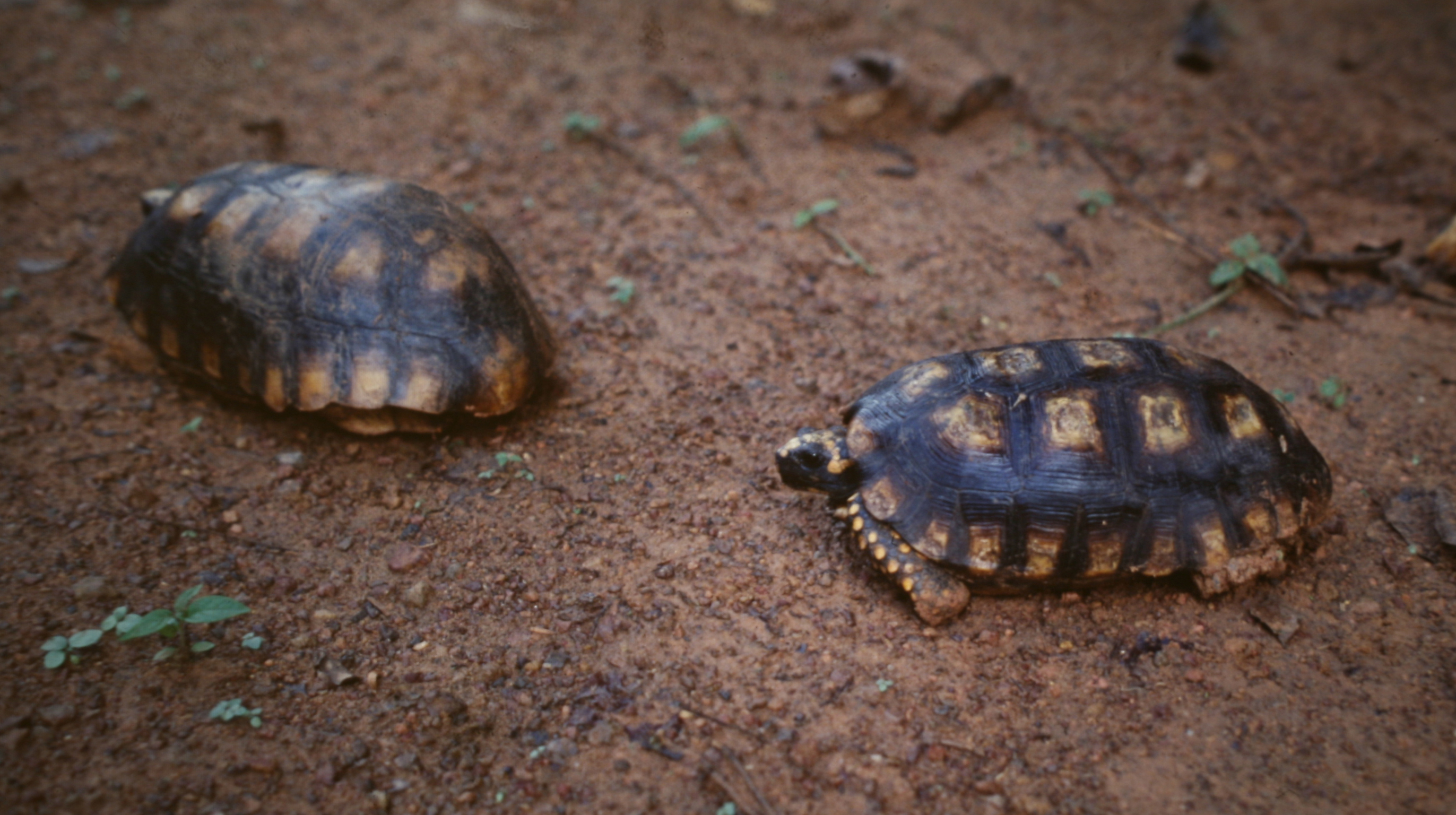
- A pair of yellow-footed tortoises

Scientific classification
- Kingdom: Animalia
- Phylum: Chordata
- Class: Reptilia
- Order: Testudines
- Suborder: Cryptodira
- Family: Testudinidae
- Genus: Chelonoidis; Fitzinger, 1835

Species
- C. carbonarius; C. chilensis; C. denticulatus; C. niger

= Chelonoidis =

Chelonoidis Temporal range: 21–0 Ma

Genus of tortoises

Chelonoidis is a genus of turtles in the tortoise family erected by Leopold Fitzinger in 1835. They are found in South America and the Galápagos Islands, and formerly had a wide distribution in the West Indies.

The multiple subspecies of the Galápagos tortoise (C. niger) are among the largest extant terrestrial chelonians. Giant members of the genus, such as Lutz's giant tortoise (C. lutzae) were also present in mainland South America and the West Indies during the Pleistocene, and the latter into the Holocene.

== Taxonomy ==
They were formerly assigned to Geochelone, but a 2006 genetic analysis indicated that they were actually most closely related to hingeback tortoises. However, a more recent genetic analysis of mtDNA has found that they are actually most closely related to the lineage containing Centrochelys and Geochelone. Their ancestors apparently floated across the Atlantic from Africa to South America in the Oligocene. This crossing was made possible by their ability to float with their heads up and to survive up to six months without food or water. Based on mtDNA analysis, the extant Chelonoidis members can be divided into two lineages, with one containing the red-footed tortoise (C. carbonarius) and yellow-footed tortoise (C. denticulatus), and the other containing the Chaco tortoise (C. chilensis) and the Galapagos tortoises (C. niger). The now-extinct West Indian radiation is thought to group with the Chaco and Galapagos tortoises but is significantly basal to both, and was a rather evolutionary distinct lineage, having diverged well before any of the modern species in the genus did and only 7 mya after the divergence of Chelonoidis from African tortoises.

A 2021 study found that the extent of divergence among the species in the Galápagos and Bahamian Chelonoidis radiations may have been overestimated, and supported subsuming many of the species in both complexes to being subspecies of two parent species; C. alburyorum for the Bahamas and Turks and Caicos Islands, and C. niger for the Galápagos. This was followed by the Turtle Taxonomy Working Group and the Reptile Database in 2021.

The names of several species names in the genus have often been misspelled, beginning in the 1980s when Chelonoidis was elevated to genus and mistakenly treated as feminine, an error recognized and fixed in 2017.

== Distribution ==
Presently, Chelonoidis are distributed throughout most of South America, as well as most of the Galápagos; the genus extended north into Central America during the Pleistocene and most of the West Indies up to the late Holocene. C. carbonarius and C. denticulatus are presently found on some of the Lesser Antillean islands, but the provenance of these individuals is unknown, and they could have been introduced by Amerindians during pre-Columbian times.

=== In the West Indies ===
In prehistoric times, a large insular radiation of giant Chelonoidis existed on many West Indian islands, including the Bahamas, Greater Antilles and Lesser Antilles. While some species such as those on Curaçao, Anguilla, and Barbados are thought to have gone extinct during the Late Pleistocene, other species such as those on the Greater Antilles and the Bahamas are thought to have been driven to extinction after the first humans arrived on the islands, from 7000 BC onwards. The Bahamian tortoise (C. alburyorum) was one of the last-surviving of these species, persisting up to 1170 AD on the Abacos, up to 1200 AD on Grand Turk, and up to 1400 AD on the Middle Caicos, just under a century prior to European colonization of the islands.

A 2017 study found that some of these species such as those from Hispaniola were specialists adapted to dry, open habitats such as Hispaniolan dry forests and had a major role in shaping them; following a decrease in the extent of these ecosystems after the end of the Pleistocene, these tortoises were restricted to refugia habitats up until their extinction.

A 2021 study identified two distinct genetic lineages within the Bahaman tortoise, C. alburyorum, but also sometimes found the remains of members of both lineages on the same island, even though the lineages would have only separated with geographic isolation. This indicates that the early inhabitants of the West Indies were successfully transporting the large tortoises across islands, presumably for the purpose of consumption, and thus causing the remains geographically isolated lineages to co-occur on the same islands.

== Chelonoidis species ==
Note that the genus name Chelonoidis is masculine under the rules of the ICZN, and adjectival species names must agree in gender; the species names below are displayed in keeping with this rule, and may differ from how they commonly appear in publications.

=== Extant and recently extinct species ===
Listed alphabetically:

- C. carbonarius – red-footed tortoise
- C. chilensis – Chaco tortoise
- C. denticulatus – yellow-footed tortoise
- C. niger – Galápagos tortoise – with the following subspecies:
  - † C. n. abingdonii – Pinta Island tortoise (extinct as of 2012, but could be bred back from hybrids and/or persist as lone individuals)
  - C. n. becki – Volcán Wolf giant tortoise
  - C. n. chathamensis – San Cristobal giant tortoise
  - C. n. darwini – Santiago Island giant tortoise
  - C. n. donfaustoi – eastern Santa Cruz tortoise
  - C. n. duncanensis – Pinzon Island giant tortoise
  - C. n. guntheri – Sierra Negra giant tortoise
  - C. n. hoodensis – Hood Island giant tortoise
  - C. n. microphyes – Volcán Darwin giant tortoise
  - † C. n. niger – Floreana giant tortoise (driven to extinction in the mid-19th century, but could be bred back from hybrids)
  - C. n. phantasticus – Fernandina Island tortoise (rediscovered in February 2019)
  - C. n. porteri – western Santa Cruz tortoise
  - †C. n. 'Santa Fe Island lineage' – Santa Fe Island tortoise (undescribed, driven to extinction in the mid-19th century)
  - C. n. vandenburghi – Volcán Alcedo giant tortoise
  - C. n. vicina – Cerro Azul giant tortoise
- † C. alburyorum – Bahamian tortoise (Late Holocene of The Bahamas and Turks & Caicos Islands)
- † C. cubensis – Cuban giant tortoise (Early Holocene of Cuba)
- † C. gersoni (Pleistocene-Holocene, Hispaniola)
- † C. marcanoi (=C. dominicensis) (Pleistocene-Holocene, Hispaniola)
- † C. monensis – Mona tortoise (Late Holocene of Isla de Mona, Puerto Rico)

Relationships of the genus, after Kehlmaier et al., 2017 and 2021.

- - Chelonoidis
    - - Chelonoidis carbonarius (red-footed tortoise)
      - Chelonoidis denticulatus (yellow-footed tortoise)
    - - - †Chelonoidis alburyorum (Bahamian giant tortoise)
      - - Chelonoidis chilensis (Chaco tortoise)
        - Chelonoidis niger (Galápagos tortoise)

=== Fossil species ===
==== Late Quaternary fossil species ====
Listed alphabetically:

- † C. lutzae – Lutz's giant tortoise (Late Pleistocene of Argentina)
- † C. marcanoi (Quaternary of the Dominican Republic) (nomen dubium as holotype fossil does not allow for distinguishing between species)
- † C. pucara (Late Pleistocene of Buenos Aires province, Argentina) (nomen dubium as the rear half of the animal was misidentified as the front)
- † C. sombrerensis – Sombrero giant tortoise (Late Pleistocene of Sombrero, Anguilla)

==== Other fossil species ====
Listed alphabetically:

- † C. australis (Miocene to Pliocene of Argentina)
- † C. gallardoi (Miocene of Argentina, Late Pleistocene of Ecuador)
- † C. gringorum (Miocene of Argentina)
- † C. hesternus (Miocene of Colombia)
