= Chelonoidis gersoni =

Chelonoidis gersoni Temporal range: Late Pleistocene–Early Holocene

Scientific classification
- Kingdom: Animalia
- Phylum: Chordata
- Class: Reptilia
- Order: Testudines
- Suborder: Cryptodira
- Family: Testudinidae
- Genus: Chelonoidis
- Species: †C. gersoni

Binomial name
- †Chelonoidis gersoni Viñola-López & Almonte, 2022

Chelonoidis gersoni, also known as Gerson's Hispaniola tortoise, is an extinct species of giant tortoise that inhabited southern Hispaniola. It is known from subfossil remains described from caves in Pedernales Province. It is named after Dominican field biologist Gerson Feliz.

The species was previously confused with the other known giant tortoise known to have inhabited southern Hispaniola, Chelonoidis marcanoi, as well as Chelonoidis dominicensis (potentially conspecific with C. marcanoi) from northern Hispaniola. However, morphological studies have identified it as a distinct species based on its triangular gular projection, unlike the rectangular gular projection of C. marcanoi. In addition, many other taxa endemic to Hispaniola are known to have different species on the northern and southern halves of the island, due to the differing ecosystems in both halves, which also formed distinct islands in the geologic past. C. gersoni appears to have been more adapted to the xeric southern half of the island, and also grew to a smaller size due to the ecological pressures of the xeric habitat.

As with other giant tortoise species from Hispaniola, C. gersoni appears to have been driven to extinction around 8000 BCE due to overhunting by the early Amerindian residents of the island.
