= Chelonoidis pucara =

Chelonoidis pucara Temporal range: Pleistocene

Scientific classification
- Kingdom: Animalia
- Phylum: Chordata
- Class: Reptilia
- Order: Testudines
- Suborder: Cryptodira
- Family: Testudinidae
- Genus: Chelonoidis
- Species: †C. pucara

Binomial name
- †Chelonoidis pucara Agnolín & Chimento, 2025

Extinct species of turtle

Chelonoidis pucara is a dubious species of extinct turtle in the genus Chelonoidis. It lived during the Pleistocene epoch.

== Taxonomy ==
Chelonoidis pucara was described as a new species in 2025 by Frederico Agnolín and Nicolás Chimento. It was reported to have unique and distinctive characteristics, which separate it from other species of Chelonoidis. According to the authors, the fossils displayed enlarged epiplastral projections, and the entoplastron had a midline suture.

Later in the same year, however, Evangelos Vlachos and Marcelo S. de la Fuente wrote a reply to the original article. They noted that some of the reported charasteristics, if true, would not only be unique for the genus but for any turtle. After examining the original drawings, Vlachos and de la Fuente concluded that the original authors had misinterpreted the fossils by identifying the posterior part of the plastron as the front. Vlachos and de la Fuente did recognize the large size of the fossils, but they did not see it as a valid reason for recognizing a new species. They concluded that Chelonoidis pucara is a nomen dubium and that the fossils can only be identified as Chelonoidis sp.

== Distribution ==
Chelonoidis pucara is known from Buenos Aires Province, Argentina.

== Description ==
The original authors estimated Chelonoidis pucara to have a carapace length of 1.7-1.8 metres, making it the largest known testudinid from South America. The holotype was an adult male.
