= Beck's least gecko =

Conservation status
- Least Concern (IUCN 3.1)

Scientific classification
- Kingdom: Animalia
- Phylum: Chordata
- Class: Reptilia
- Order: Squamata
- Suborder: Gekkota
- Family: Sphaerodactylidae
- Genus: Sphaerodactylus
- Species: S. becki

Binomial name
- Sphaerodactylus becki Schmidt, 1919

Species of lizard

Beck's least gecko (Sphaerodactylus becki) is a species of lizard in the family Sphaerodactylidae. The species is endemic to Navassa Island.

== Etymology ==
The specific name, becki, is in honor of American ornithologist Rollo Howard Beck.

== Habitat ==
The preferred habitat of S. becki is dry forest.

== Behavior ==
S. becki hides in leaf litter and under rocks.

== Reproduction ==
S. becki is oviparous.
