= Chelonoidis alburyorum =

Chelonoidis alburyorum Temporal range: late Pleistocene - Holocene

Conservation status
- Extinct (~1400 CE)

Scientific classification
- Kingdom: Animalia
- Phylum: Chordata
- Class: Reptilia
- Order: Testudines
- Suborder: Cryptodira
- Family: Testudinidae
- Genus: Chelonoidis
- Species: †C. alburyorum

Binomial name
- †Chelonoidis alburyorum Franz & Franz, 2009

Extinct species of tortoise

Chelonoidis alburyorum is an extinct species of giant tortoise that lived in the Lucayan Archipelago (including The Bahamas and Turks and Caicos Islands) from the Late Pleistocene to around 1400 CE. The species was discovered and described by Richard Franz and Shelley E. Franz, the findings being published in 2009.

== Name ==
The specific epithet, alburyorum, is in honor of Bahamian naturalist Nancy Ann Albury.

== Fossil ==
The shell of C. alburyorum was 47 cm (19 inches) in length. Fossils of the species were discovered in Sawmill Sink, a blue hole. Other sites where C. alburyorum fossils have been found include cave systems and an inland deep blue sink hole.

== Extinction ==
C. alburyorum was the last-surviving of the West Indian Chelonoidis, persisting up to 1170 CE on the Abacos, up to 1200 CE on Grand Turk, and up to 1400 CE on the Middle Caicos, just under a century prior to European colonization of the islands.
