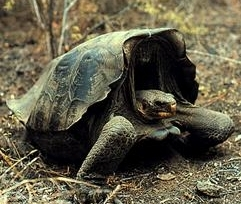
- Adult Volcán Wolf giant tortoise

Conservation status
- Vulnerable (IUCN 3.1)
- CITES Appendix I

Scientific classification
- Kingdom: Animalia
- Phylum: Chordata
- Class: Reptilia
- Order: Testudines
- Suborder: Cryptodira
- Family: Testudinidae
- Genus: Chelonoidis
- Species: C. niger
- Subspecies: C. n. becki

Trinomial name
- Chelonoidis niger becki (Rothschild, 1901)

Synonyms
- Testudo becki Rothschild, 1901; Geochelone elephantopus becki — Pritchard, 1967; Geochelone nigra becki — Iverson, 1992; Chelonoidis nigra becki — David, 1994; Geochelone becki — Cisneros-Heredia, 2006; Chelonoidis becki — Rhodin, van Dijk, Iverson & Shaffer, 2010

= Volcán Wolf giant tortoise =

Subspecies of tortoise

The Volcán Wolf giant tortoise (Chelonoidis niger becki), also known commonly as the Wolf Volcano giant tortoise and the Cape Berkeley giant tortoise, is a subspecies of Galápagos tortoise in the family Testudinidae. The subspecies is native to the north side of Ecuador's Isabela Island (formerly Albemarle Island). Chelonoidis becki has links to two different lineages including that of Chelonoidis darwini from the nearby island of Santiago. C. becki has been found to be the product of a double colonization event beginning around 199,000 years ago, and had been formed through introgression, where greater male selectivity was exhibited by purebred females in one of the lineages. It is most commonly found on the northern, western, and southwestern slopes of Volcán Wolf, the volcano that it is named for. Having evolved to live in a specific environment, C. becki only occupies an estimated range of about 263 square kilometers. An estimated 1,150 Volcán Wolf giant tortoises inhabit Volcán Wolf.

== Etymology ==
The specific name, becki, is in honor of American ornithologist Rollo Howard Beck.

== Habitat ==
The preferred natural habitats of C. becki are forest and shrubland.

== Diet ==
C. becki has a vegetarian diet.
