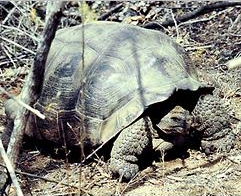
- Chelonoidis microphyes

Conservation status
- Endangered (IUCN 3.1)
- CITES Appendix I

Scientific classification
- Kingdom: Animalia
- Phylum: Chordata
- Class: Reptilia
- Order: Testudines
- Suborder: Cryptodira
- Family: Testudinidae
- Genus: Chelonoidis
- Species: C. niger
- Subspecies: C. n. microphyes

Trinomial name
- Chelonoidis niger microphyes (Günther, 1875)

Synonyms
- Testudo microphyes Günther, 1875; Geochelone elephantopus microphyes Pritchard, 1967; Chelonoidis elephantopus microphyes Obst, 1986; Geochelone nigra microphyes Iverson, 1992; Geochelone microphyes Cisneros-Heredia, 2006; Chelonoidis microphyes TTWG, 2017

= Chelonoidis niger microphyes =

Subspecies of giant tortoise

Chelonoidis niger microphyes, also known as the Volcán Darwin giant tortoise, Darwin Volcano giant tortoise or Tagus Cove giant tortoise, is a subspecies of Galápagos tortoise endemic to the Galápagos archipelago in the equatorial eastern Pacific Ocean. The specific epithet microphyes (“small when full-grown”) is based on the mistaken assumption by describer Albert Günther that the holotype specimen (with a carapace length of only 57.2 cm) was of an adult male.

== Taxonomy ==
This tortoise is a subspecies of Chelonoidis niger, and is sometimes considered to be a distinct species of its own. The type locality is Tagus Cove, near the base of Darwin Volcano on Isabela Island.

== Description ==
Male tortoises grow to about 135 cm and females to about 86 cm in length, with domed carapaces.

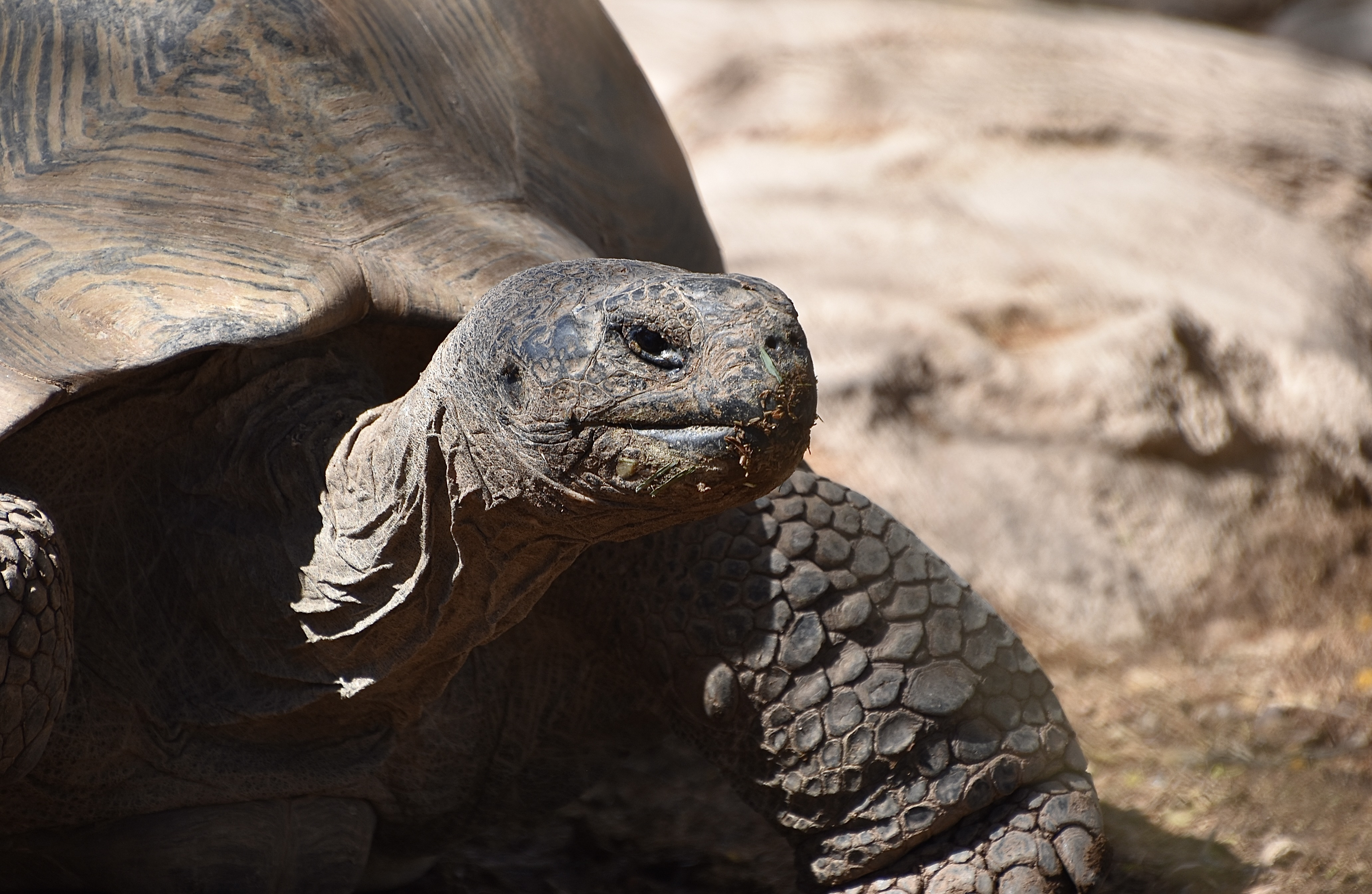
A Volcán Darwin giant tortoise at Phoenix Zoo.

== Behaviour ==
The tortoises are mainly active in the early morning and late afternoon, resting in shade during the hottest part of the day and sleeping beneath shrubs at night. After heavy rain they wallow in muddy pools. Adults migrate seasonally from the caldera of the volcano to its lower slopes to graze on vegetation after wet season rains.

=== Feeding ===
The tortoises feed on grass, leaves, berries and lichens in the wet season, and mainly cacti in the dry season.

=== Breeding ===
Male tortoises compete with each other by extending their necks, gaping, biting and pushing. They utter loud guttural noises while mating. Females start nesting in May and June at the end of the wet season.

== Distribution and habitat ==
The tortoise's range is limited to an area of about 67 km^{2} on the south-western slope of Darwin Volcano on the northern part of Isabela Island. There it inhabits deciduous and evergreen forests as well as dry grassland.

== Conservation ==
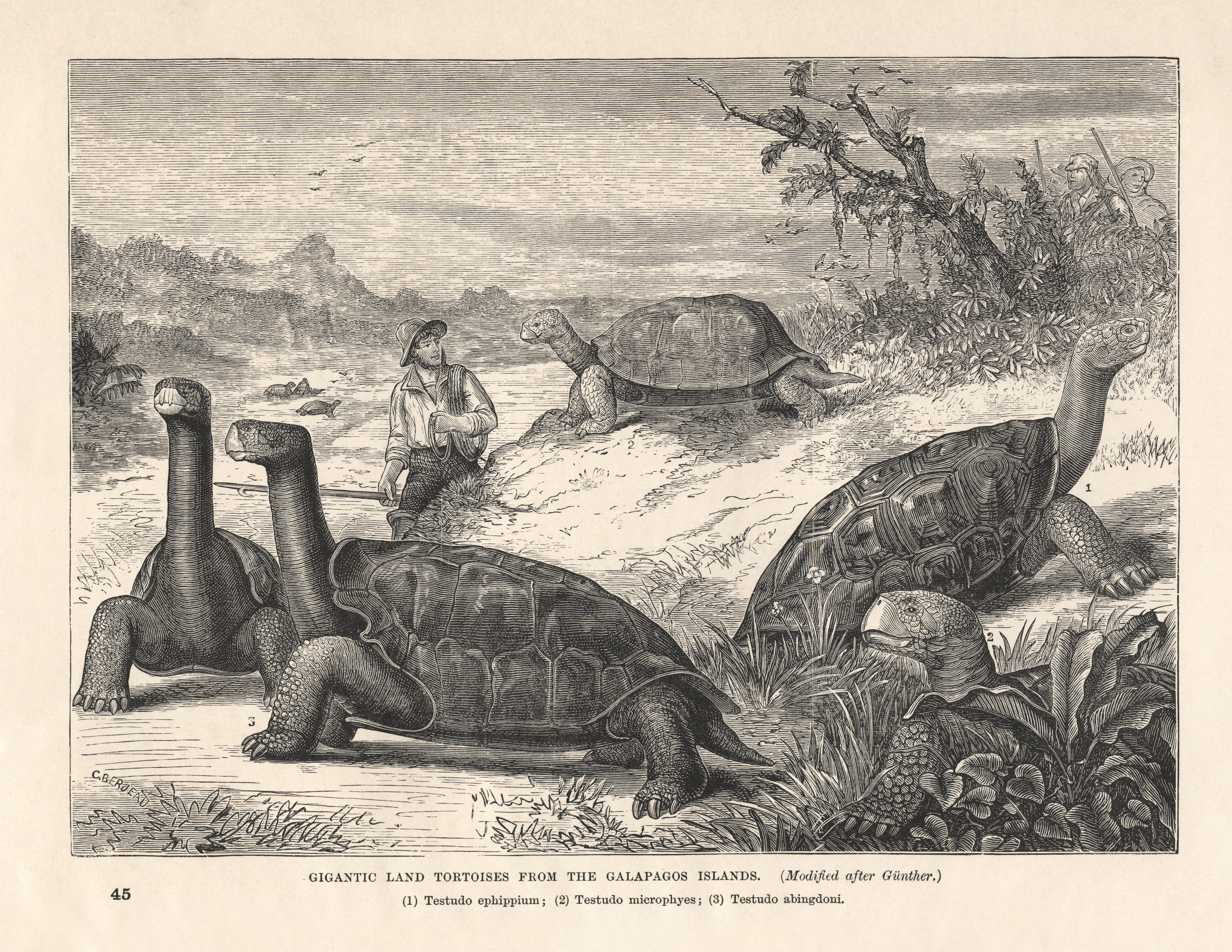
Charles Darwin depicted in an engraving with three species of Galápagos tortoises, including C. n. microphyes (Cassell's Natural History, 1878)

The tortoise population is estimated to comprise some 500–1,000 mature individuals, a decline of 94% since 1840, and the subspecies is considered to be Endangered. The tortoises were historically overexploited for food and oil by sailors and settlers. Ongoing threats include predation of eggs and hatchlings and competition for food by introduced animals, including feral dogs, feral cats, rats, mice, domestic pigs and goats, as well as habitat degradation and volcanic eruptions.
