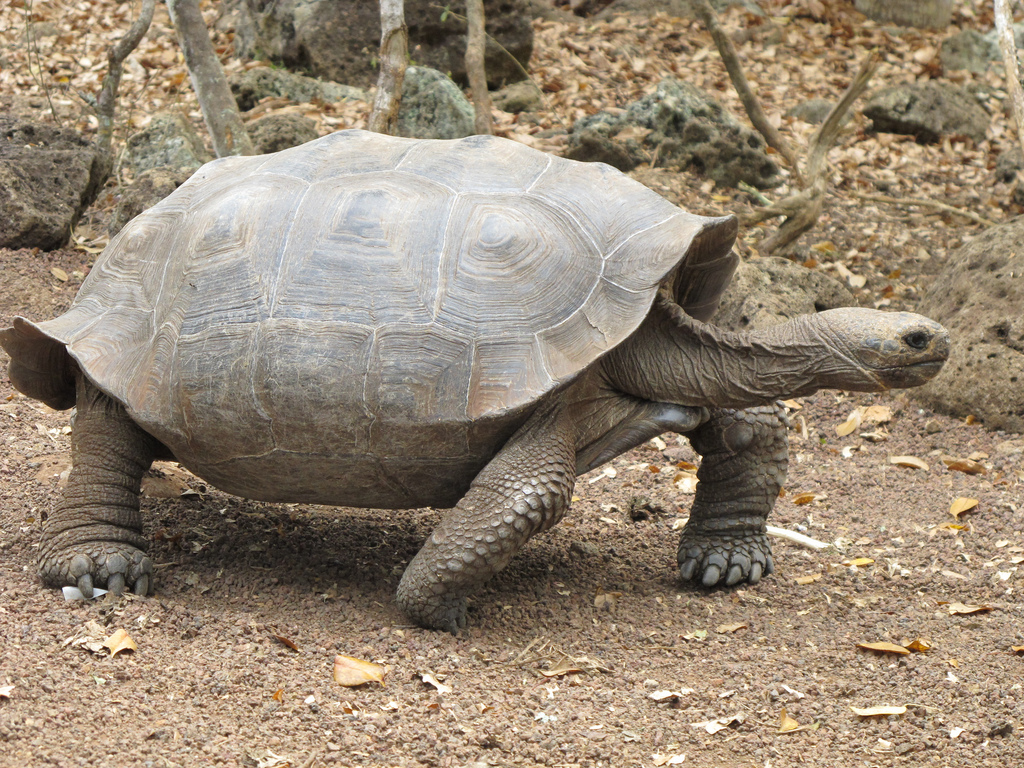

Conservation status
- Endangered (IUCN 3.1)
- CITES Appendix I (CITES)

Scientific classification
- Kingdom: Animalia
- Phylum: Chordata
- Class: Reptilia
- Order: Testudines
- Suborder: Cryptodira
- Family: Testudinidae
- Genus: Chelonoidis
- Species: C. niger
- Subspecies: C. n. chathamensis

Trinomial name
- Chelonoidis niger chathamensis (Van Denburgh, 1907)

Synonyms
- Testudo chathamensis Van Denburgh, 1907; Geochelone nigra chathamensis (Van Denburgh, 1907)

= Chelonoidis niger chathamensis =

San Cristóbal giant tortoise

Subspecies of turtle

Chelonoidis niger chathamensis, commonly known as the Chatham Island giant tortoise or the San Cristóbal giant tortoise, is a subspecies of Galápagos tortoise endemic to San Cristóbal Island in the Galápagos.

== Population history ==
The subspecies was heavily exploited and eliminated over much of its original range. Trampling of nests by feral donkeys, and the predation of hatchlings by feral dogs decimated populations, but the breeding program has led to successful releases.

Fencing of nests and dog eradication in the 1970s helped in the population recovery.

Their population is thought to have dropped to as low as 500-700 individuals in the 1970s, and was around 24,000 prior to human contact. In a census conducted in November 2016, the population was found to be making a rapid recovery. A total of around 6,700 individuals were found, with around 2,700 mature adults and 3,750 juveniles.

Breeding centers such as the Galapaguera of Cerro Colorado were established in order to encourage captive reproduction of the endangered Galapagos tortoise. They were then released in their areas of origin to recover the wild populations.

== Description ==
It has a wide, black shell, its shape intermediate between the saddle-backed and domed subspecies: adult males are rather saddle-backed, but females and young males are wider in the middle and more domed. A now-extinct, more flat-shelled form occurred throughout the wetter and higher regions of the island most altered by man when the island was colonized. The type specimen was from this extinct population, so it is possible that the subspecies currently designated C. n. chathamensis is mistakenly applied.
