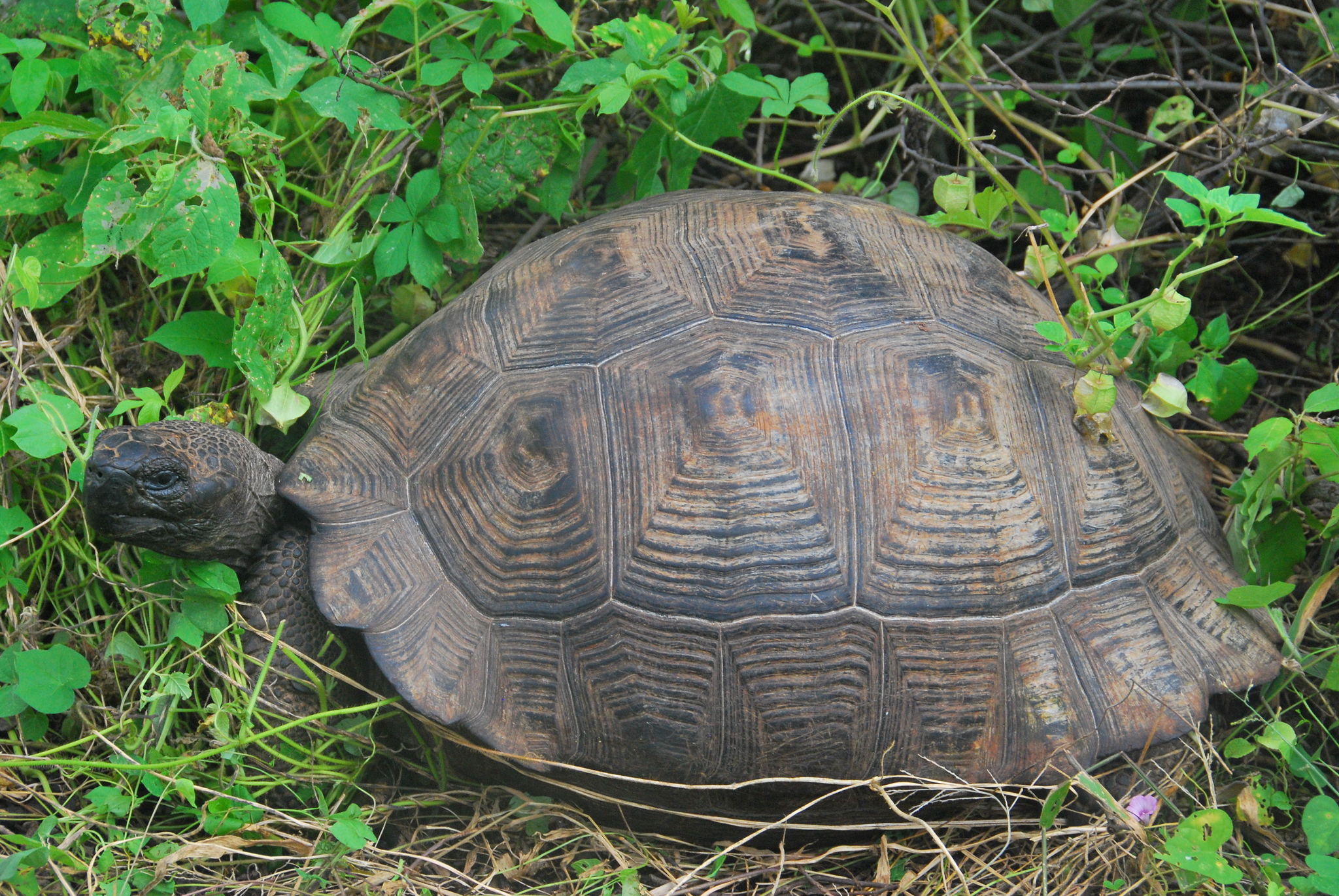
- Chelonoidis vandenburghi

Conservation status
- Vulnerable (IUCN 3.1)
- CITES Appendix I

Scientific classification
- Kingdom: Animalia
- Phylum: Chordata
- Class: Reptilia
- Order: Testudines
- Suborder: Cryptodira
- Family: Testudinidae
- Genus: Chelonoidis
- Species: C. niger
- Subspecies: C. n. vandenburghi

Trinomial name
- Chelonoidis niger vandenburghi (De Sola, 1930)

Synonyms
- Testudo vandenburghi De Sola, 1930; Geochelone elephantopus vandenburghi Pritchard, 1967; Geochelone vandenburghi Ernst & Barbour, 1989; Geochelone nigra vandenburghi Iverson, 1992; Chelonoidis vandenburghi TTWG, 2017

= Chelonoidis niger vandenburghi =

Subspecies of giant tortoise

Chelonoidis niger vandenburghi, also known as the Volcán Alcedo giant tortoise, the Alcedo Volcano giant tortoise or the Alcedo giant tortoise, is a subspecies of Galápagos tortoise endemic to the Galápagos archipelago in the equatorial eastern Pacific Ocean. The specific epithet vandenburghi honours American herpetologist John Van Denburgh.

== Taxonomy ==
This tortoise is a subspecies of Chelonoidis niger, and is sometimes considered to be a distinct species itself.

== Description ==
Male tortoises grow to about 129 cm (51 in) and females to about 90 cm (35 in) in length, with domed carapaces.

== Behaviour ==
The tortoises spend most of the day feeding, resting, or congregating in muddy pools. They sleep in the open at night. Adults migrate seasonally, travelling along the rim of the volcano's caldera and descending to the lower slopes to graze on new vegetation after wet season rains.

=== Feeding ===
The tortoises feed on grass, leaves, forbs, sedges, fruit and lichens, obtaining water from their diet and pools of rainwater.

=== Breeding ===
Male tortoises compete with each other by extending their necks, gaping, biting and pushing. They utter loud guttural noises while mating. Females start nesting in May and June at the end of the wet season, laying clutches of 6–26 eggs in soft soil. Juvenile tortoises tend to stay at lower, warmer, elevations for the first 10–15 years of their lives

== Distribution and habitat ==
The tortoise's range is limited to an area of 476 km^{2} (184 sq mi) on the Alcedo Volcano on the central part of Isabela Island. There it inhabits deciduous and evergreen forests as well as humid grassland.

== Conservation ==
The tortoise population is estimated to comprise some 6,300 individuals, a decline of 84% since 1840, and the subspecies is considered to be Vulnerable. The tortoise population formerly suffered through predation and trampling of eggs and hatchlings, as well as habitat degradation, by introduced animals including pigs, donkeys and goats. Volcanic eruptions have also affected the tortoises and their habitat, with a major eruption of Alcedo 100,000 years ago thought to be the cause of the subspecies' low genetic diversity.
