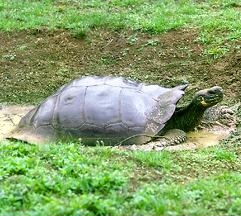

Conservation status
- Critically Endangered (IUCN 3.1)
- CITES Appendix I

Scientific classification
- Kingdom: Animalia
- Phylum: Chordata
- Class: Reptilia
- Order: Testudines
- Suborder: Cryptodira
- Family: Testudinidae
- Genus: Chelonoidis
- Species: C. niger
- Subspecies: C. n. darwini

Trinomial name
- Chelonoidis niger darwini (Van Denburgh, 1907)

Synonyms
- Testudo darwini Van Denburgh, 1907; Testudo elephantopus darwini — Mertens & Wermuth, 1955; Geochelone elephantopus darwini — Pritchard, 1967; Geochelone nigra darwini — Iverson, 1992; Chelonoidis nigra darwini — David, 1994; Geochelone darwini — Cisneros-Heredia, 2006; Chelonoidis darwini — Rhodin et al., 2010

= Santiago Island giant tortoise =

Santiago Island giant tortoise Temporal range: Pleistocene - Recent

Species of turtle

The Santiago Island giant tortoise (Chelonoidis niger darwini), also known commonly as the Santiago giant tortoise and the James Island tortoise, is a subspecies of Galápagos tortoise in the family Testudinidae. The subspecies is endemic to Santiago Island (also known as James Island and San Salvador) in the Galápagos.

== Population history ==
None of C. n. darwini were removed from Santiago Island in the early 19th century by whaling vessels, and introduced goats reduced the coastal lowlands to deserts, restricting the tortoises to the interior. The sex ratio is strongly imbalanced in favour of the males, and most nests and young are destroyed by feral pigs. Some nests are now protected by lava corrals, and since 1970, eggs have been transported to the Charles Darwin Research Station for hatching and rearing. Release programs and measures for nest protection from feral pigs have been successful. There are approximately 1,165 individuals in the wild, with an increasing population.

== Habitat ==
C. n. darwini is diurnal and terrestrial. Their habitats include deciduous forests, evergreen montane forests, and humid grass land. At maturity they reside in the highlands of Santiago Island in the Galapagos. However, in the first 10-15 years of their lives the remain in they mountainous lands of the island.

== Description ==
The gray to black carapace of C. n. darwini is intermediate in shape between the saddle-backed subspecies and the domed subspecies of Galápagos tortoises. It has only a shallow cervical indentation. The anterior carapacial rim is not appreciably upturned, and the posterior marginals are flared, slightly upturned, and slightly serrated.

== Diet ==
The diet of C. n. darwini consists of cacti, herbs, and grass found on Santiago Island. The water in their diet is obtained by the vegetation they consume or by temporary pools.

== Etymology ==
The specific name, darwini, is in honor of English naturalist Charles Darwin.
