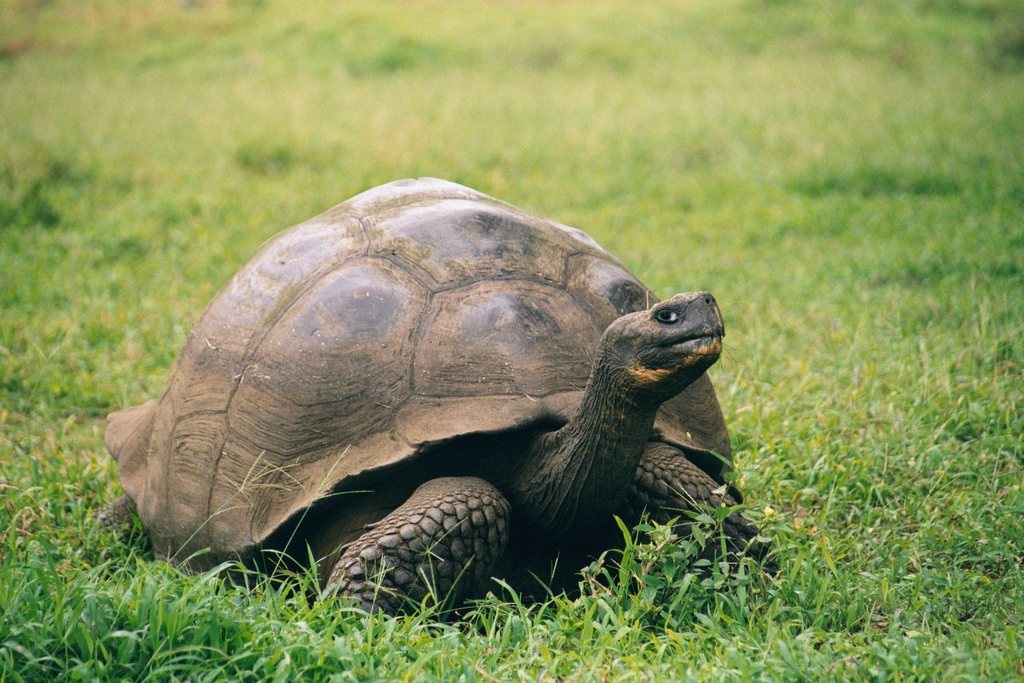

Conservation status
- Critically Endangered (IUCN 3.1)
- CITES Appendix I

Scientific classification
- Kingdom: Animalia
- Phylum: Chordata
- Class: Reptilia
- Order: Testudines
- Suborder: Cryptodira
- Family: Testudinidae
- Genus: Chelonoidis
- Species: C. niger
- Subspecies: C. n. porteri

Trinomial name
- Chelonoidis niger porteri (Rothschild, 1903)
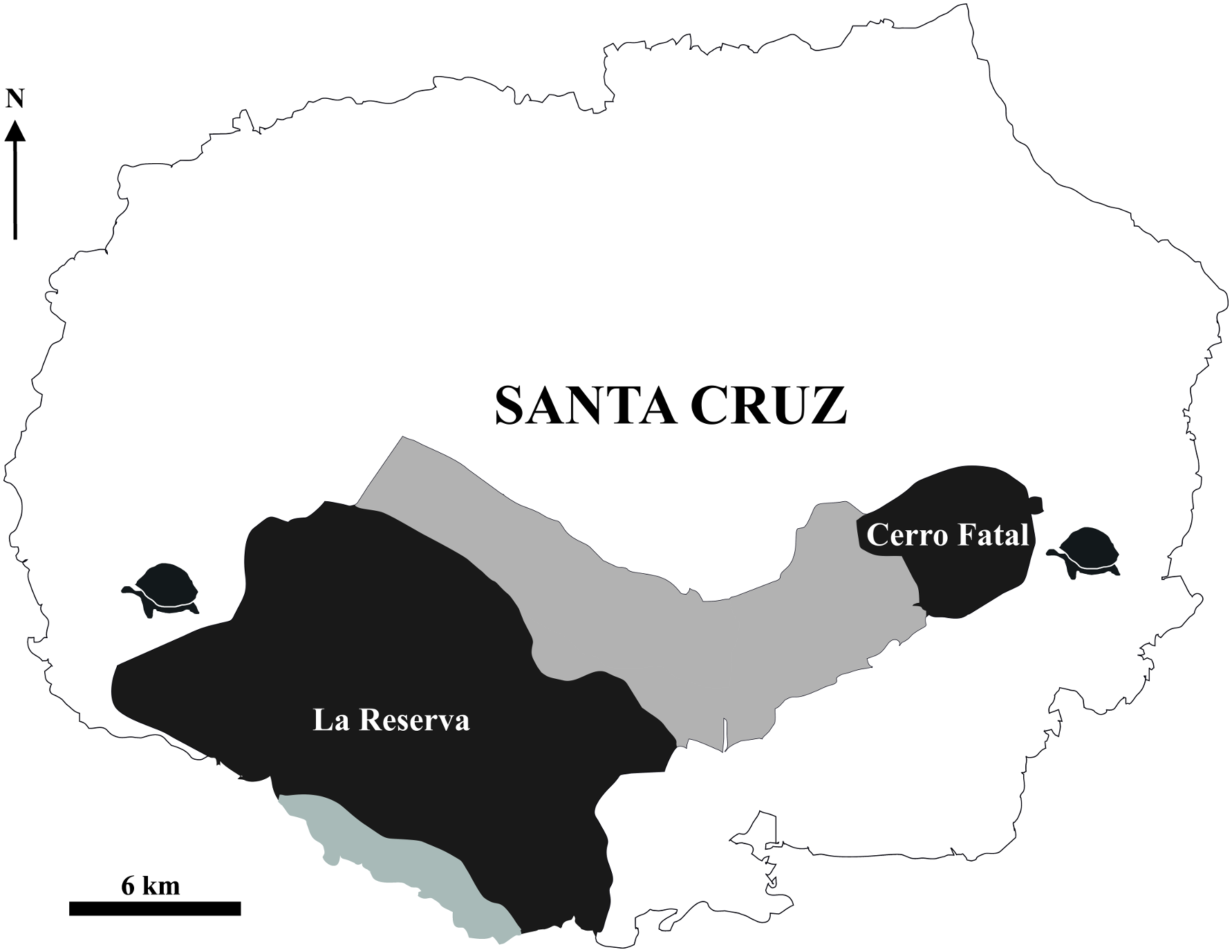
- range on coastal slopes of La Reserva

Synonyms
- Testudo porteri Rothschild, 1903; Geochelone nigra porteri (Rothschild, 1903)

= Western Santa Cruz tortoise =

Subspecies of turtle

The western Santa Cruz tortoise (Chelonoidis niger porteri) is a subspecies of Galápagos tortoise endemic to Santa Cruz Island in the Galápagos. They are found only on the southwestern slopes of the island, with an estimated range of 141 sq. kilometers. There are approximately 3400 individuals in the wild, and have seen rising numbers in population, despite being critically endangered. MtDNA evidence shows that there are actually three genetically distinct populations on Santa Cruz Island. They are characterised by a black, oval carapace (to 130 cm) that is domed, higher in the centre than in the front, and broad anteriorly. Their life expectancy is 175 years.

Map of the Galápagos Islands showing locations of different tortoise species

In 2015, the small, eastern Cerro Fatal population of the island was described as a distinct subspecies, C. n. donfaustoi, most closely related to chathamensis (and forming a clade with it plus abingdoni and hoodensis), while the main southwestern porteri population was found to be closer to the Floreana and southern Isabela tortoises.
