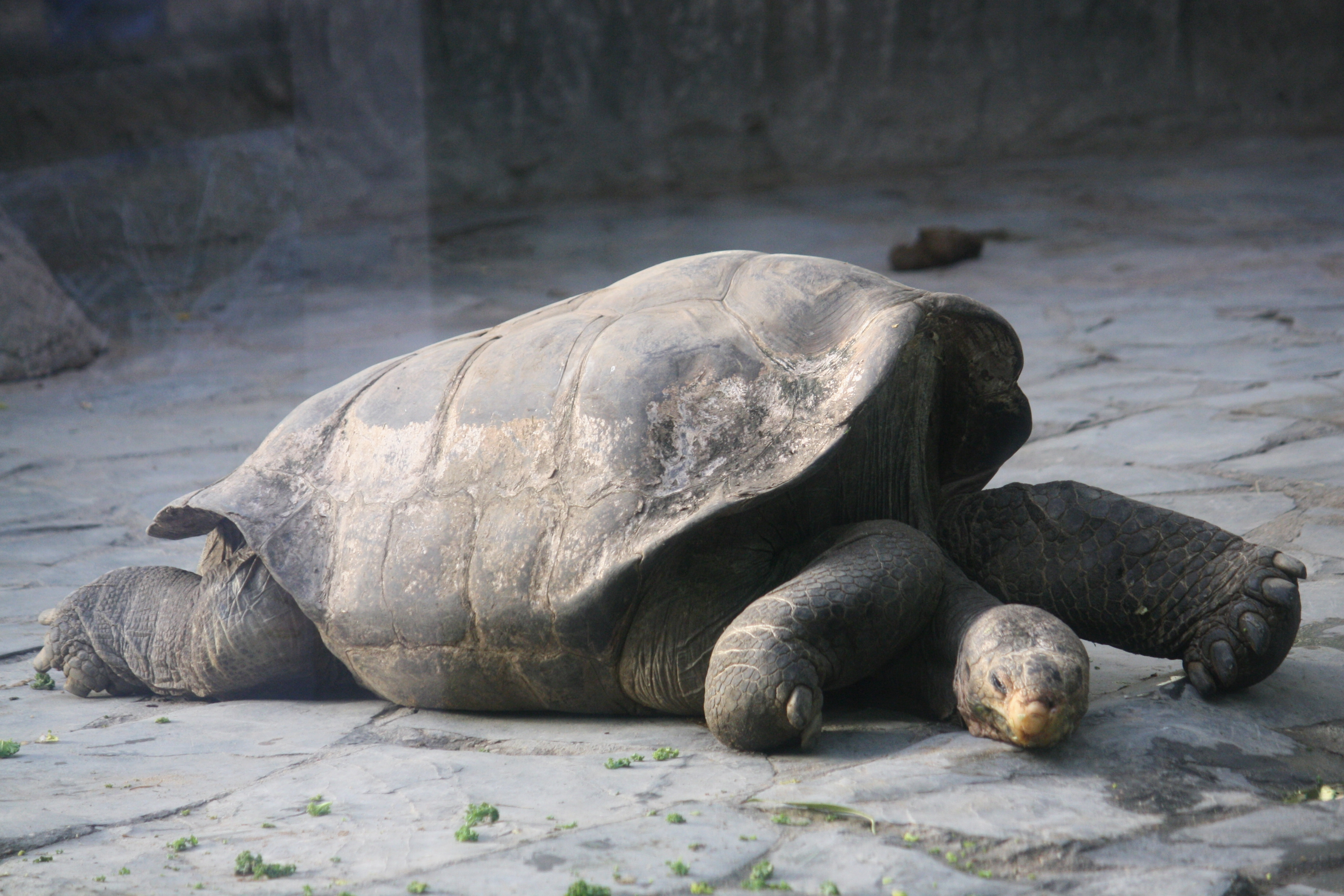

Conservation status
- Vulnerable (IUCN 3.1)
- CITES Appendix I (CITES)

Scientific classification
- Kingdom: Animalia
- Phylum: Chordata
- Class: Reptilia
- Order: Testudines
- Suborder: Cryptodira
- Family: Testudinidae
- Genus: Chelonoidis
- Species: C. niger
- Subspecies: C. n. duncanensis

Trinomial name
- Chelonoidis niger duncanensis (Garman, 1966)

Synonyms
- Testudo duncanensis Garman, 1917; Geochelone nigra duncanensis Garman in Pritchard, 1996

= Pinzón Island giant tortoise =

Subspecies of turtle

Chelonoidis niger duncanensis, commonly known as the Pinzón Island giant tortoise, is a subspecies of Galápagos tortoise endemic to Pinzón Island in the Galápagos.

== Population history ==
Although relatively undisturbed by whalers, fairly large numbers of tortoises were removed by expeditions in the latter half of the 19th century and the early 20th. After the introduction of black rats (Rattus rattus) and brown rats (Rattus norvegicus) some time before 1900, no natural breeding succeeded. Since 1965, eggs have been transported to the Charles Darwin Research Station for hatching and rearing. Over 75% of those released between 1970 and 1990 survived. There are currently around 532 known individuals, which live in the southwestern side of Pinzón Island.

== Description ==
This saddle-backed species is one of the smallest of the Galápagos tortoises. Its brownish-gray, oblong carapace has only a very shallow cervical indentation, the anterior marginals little to much upturned, and the slightly serrated posterior marginals flared and upturned. The carapace is usually compressed or narrowed anteriorly.
