= Pinta Island =

Island in the Galápagos Archipelago

Pinta Island (Abingdon Island)
- Location within Galápagos Islands

Geography
- Location: Galápagos Islands, Ecuador
- Coordinates: 0.587252°N 90.762184°W
- Archipelago: Galápagos Islands

Administration
- Ecuador
- Province: Galápagos Province
- Canton: Santa Cruz

Pinta Island (Spanish: Isla Pinta) is one of the Galápagos Islands in Ecuador, west of South America. Pinta has an area of 60 km^{2} (23 sq mi) and a maximum altitude of 777 meters (2,549 ft).

== Names ==
The Spanish name Pinta—an adjective meaning "spotted"—honors the Pinta, the nickname of one of the three ships of Christopher Columbus's first voyage. Santa Maria Island is similarly named for another one of his vessels and Pinzón Island is partially named for the Pinta's captain Martín Alonso Pinzón.

The island was charted by the English pirate William Ambrosia Cowley as Earl of Abingdon's Island in 1684 in honor of James Bertie, 1st Earl of Abingdon. This was later simplified to Abingdon Island.

== Geography ==
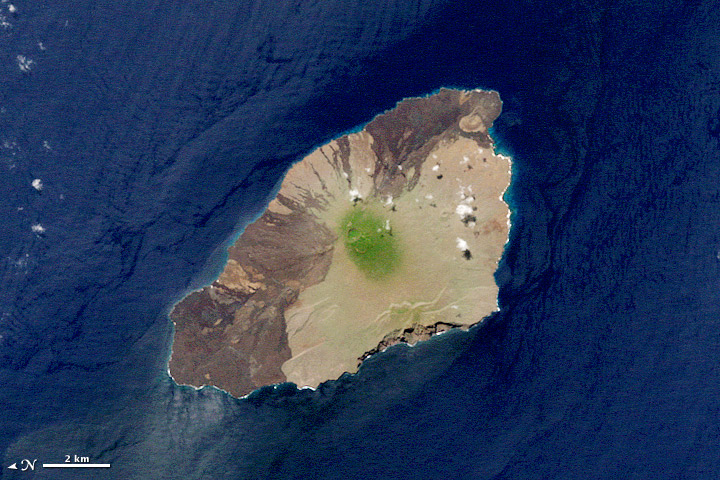
Satellite image of Pinta Island

The elongated island of Pinta is the northernmost of the active Galápagos volcanoes. Pinta is a shield volcano with an extensive underwater footprint originating from NNW-trending fissures. It has an area of 60 km^{2} (23 sq mi) and a maximum altitude of 777 meters (2,549 ft).

The rocks around the north of the island were previously known as Norris's Rocks, while an outcropping on the west side of the island was known as Rycaut's Rock.

== Wildlife ==
Pinta was the original home to Lonesome George, perhaps the most famous tortoise in the Galápagos Islands. He was the last known representative of the subspecies Chelonoidis nigra abingdonii. The most northern major island in the Galápagos, at one time Isla Pinta had a thriving tortoise population. The island's vegetation was devastated over several decades by introduced feral goats, thus diminishing food supplies for the native tortoises. A prolonged effort to exterminate goats introduced to Pinta was completed in 1990, and the vegetation of the island is starting to return to its former state.

Pinta Island is also home to swallow-tailed gulls, marine iguanas, Galapagos hawks, Galapagos fur seals and a number of other birds and mammals.

On January 28, 2008, Galápagos National Park official Victor Carrion announced that 53 sea lions (13 pups, 25 youngsters, 9 males and 6 females) at Pinta had been found killed with their heads caved in. In 2001, poachers killed 35 male sea lions.

== See also ==
- Volcanoes of the Galápagos Islands
