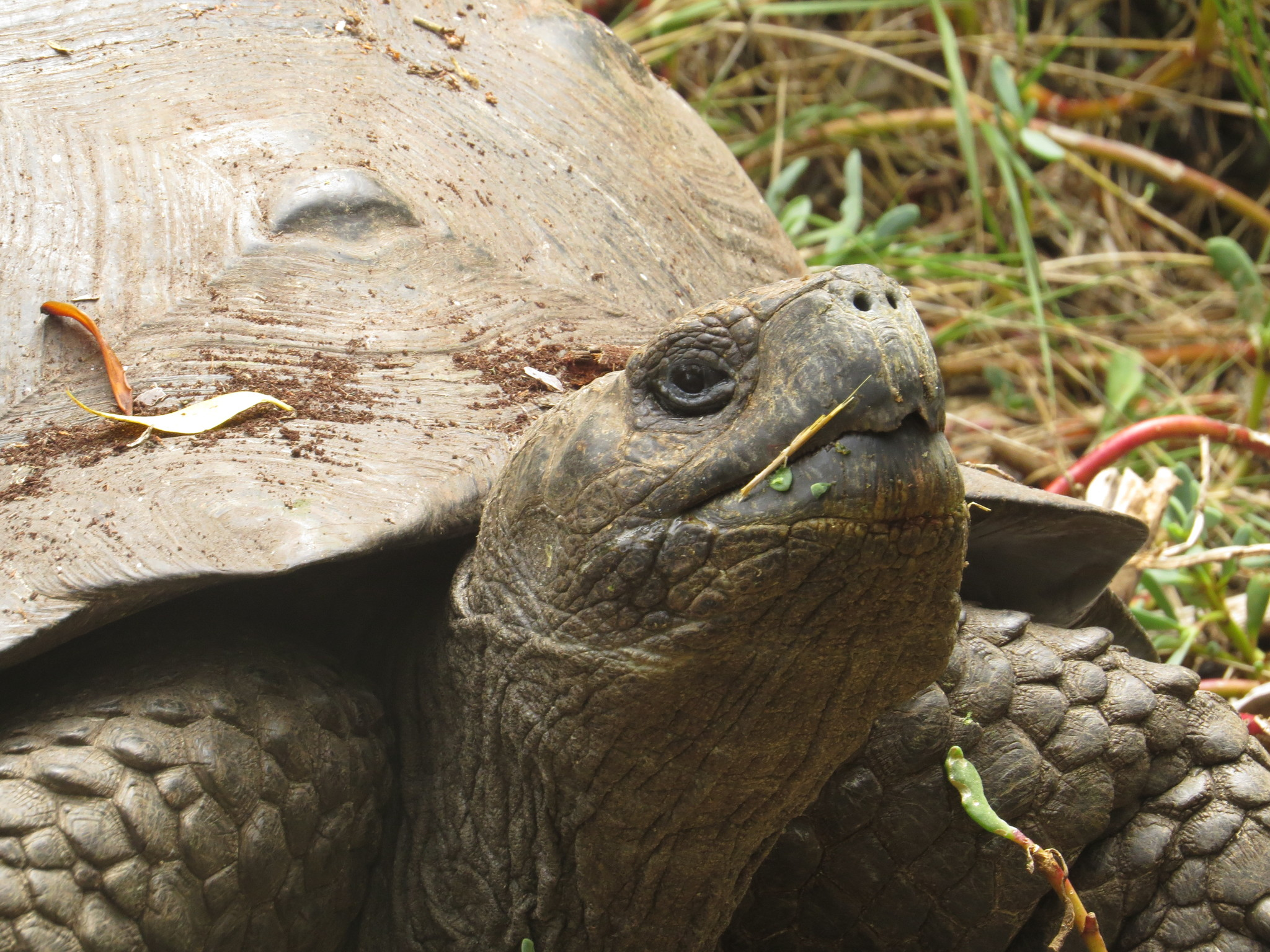
- Chelonoidis guentheri

Conservation status
- Critically Endangered (IUCN 3.1)
- CITES Appendix I

Scientific classification
- Kingdom: Animalia
- Phylum: Chordata
- Class: Reptilia
- Order: Testudines
- Suborder: Cryptodira
- Family: Testudinidae
- Genus: Chelonoidis
- Species: C. niger
- Subspecies: C. n. guentheri

Trinomial name
- Chelonoidis niger guentheri (Baur, 1889)

Synonyms
- Testudo güntheri Baur, 1889; Testudo wallacei Rothschild, 1902; Geochelone elephantopus guntheri Pritchard, 1967; Geochelone nigra guntheri Iverson, 1992; Geochelone guntheri Cisneros-Heredia, 2006

= Chelonoidis niger guentheri =

Sierra Negra giant tortoise

Subspecies of giant tortoise

Chelonoidis niger guentheri, commonly known as the Sierra Negra giant tortoise or Günther's giant tortoise, is a subspecies of Galápagos tortoise endemic to the Galápagos archipelago in the eastern Pacific Ocean. The specific epithet guentheri honours zoologist Albert Günther.

== Taxonomy ==
This tortoise is a subspecies of Chelonoidis niger, and is sometimes considered a distinct species.

== Description ==
Male tortoises grow to about 120 cm (47 in) and females to about 92 cm (36 in) in length and may have either domed or flattened carapaces.

== Behaviour ==
=== Feeding ===
The tortoises graze on shrubs and low-growing herbaceous vegetation, consuming herbs, grass, cacti, lichens, and fruit.

=== Breeding ===
Male tortoises compete with each other by extending their necks, gaping, biting and shell-bumping. They produce loud guttural noises while mating. Females lay clutches of usually 6–11 (occasionally up to 17) eggs. Juvenile tortoises tend to remain in the warmer, lowland, part of the subspecies' range for the first 10–15 years of their lives.

== Distribution and habitat ==
The tortoise's range is limited to an area of about 800 km^{2} (310 sq mi) on the slopes of the Sierra Negra volcano, from near sea-level to an altitude of around 1,000 m (3,300 ft), at the southern end of Isabela Island. There it inhabits deciduous and evergreen forests, dry grassland, introduced vegetation and agricultural land. The population is estimated to comprise some 400–700 mature individuals, a decline of 99% from an estimated 71,000 individuals prior to human contact with the islands.

A 2023 population census of Southern Isabella tortoise subspecies (also including C. n. vicina) estimated the subspecies population to be around 704 individuals.

== Conservation ==
The subspecies is considered to be Critically Endangered. The population was historically overexploited for food and oil by sailors and settlers, and some poaching continues. Other threats include predation of eggs and hatchlings, as well as habitat degradation, by introduced animals, including dogs, rodents, pigs, goats and fire ants. Volcanic eruptions also threaten the tortoises and their habitat.
