= Pinzón Island =

Island in Ecuador

Pinzón Island (Duncan Island)
- Location within Galápagos Islands

Geography
- Location: Galápagos Islands, Ecuador
- Coordinates: 0.610236°S 90.666234°W
- Archipelago: Galápagos Islands
- Highest elevation: 458 m (1503 ft)

Administration
- Ecuador

Pinzón or Pinzon Island (Spanish: Isla Pinzón) is an island in Ecuador's Galápagos Archipelago. It has no permanent population, an area of 18 square kilometers (6.9 sq mi), and a maximum elevation of 458 meters (1,503 ft). Home to giant Galápagos tortoises of the subspecies Chelonoidis duncanensis and Galápagos sea lions, the island has no visitor facilities and a permit is required for legal visits.

== Names ==
The Spanish name Pinzón honors the brothers Martín Alonso and Vicente Yáñez Pinzón, who served as the captains of the Pinta and Niña on Christopher Columbus's first voyage. Pinta Island is named after the ship itself.

The English pirate William Ambrosia Cowley charted the island as Dean's Island in honor of Samuel Pepys's protegé Anthony Deane. It was later written Deane Island before the British captain James Colnett renamed it Duncan Island in 1794 after Admiral Adam Duncan, later created 1st Viscount Duncan after his victory over the Dutch at Camperdown in 1797.

== Geography ==
Pinzón is part of the Galápagos Islands. It has an area of 18 square kilometers (6.9 sq mi), and a maximum elevation of 458 meters (1,503 ft). Pinzon island is a dormant shield volcano with no recorded eruptions within the past 10,000 years. On the island, the volcanic crater is still visible to the south-west of the island. The area of the island is 18 km squared, and its maximum altitude is 458 m. The island is made mainly of igneous rock, more specifically, basalt formed during past eruptions.

The island was formed alongside other islands situated along the Nazca tectonic plate. The underwater volcanoes on the edge of the tectonic plates formed the islands through volcanic activity. After the volcanoes erupt, the lava would harden on the volcano's shell. This repeated volcanic eruption and lifting eventually stacked above sea level, forming all the Galapagos islands. These periodically active volcanoes created an arid landscape for the islands. The underwater volcanoes are formed when tectonic plates pull away from each other; the Nazca plate travels eastward, ripping itself away from the South-American plate. The area in between the tectonic plates are called the Galapagos hotspot, because of the underwater volcanoes that form.

== Flora ==
Pinzón marks the geographical center of the Galápagos Islands, but neither of the two main Galápagos tree species are present. A unique species of daisy tree is found in the humid zone.

== Wildlife ==
During January 2012, invasive rodents were removed from the island by The Galápagos National Park, assisted by Island Conservation to benefit the Pinzón giant tortoise. An infestation of non-native rats began in the mid 18th century with the arrival of European sailors. The rats devastated the tortoise population by eating their eggs and young hatchlings that were too small to defend themselves. In December 2014, after 100 years the first new generation of tortoise hatchlings were spotted on Pinzón.

== Human Impact ==
Human activity has threatened the native population on and surrounding the island. Overfishing is a crime within the Galapagos islands that has become a serious problem. This overfishing is caused by the desirable fish surrounding the island, such as scalloped hammerhead sharks and brown sea cucumbers which can be sold at high prices due to their rarity. Additionally, explorers during the 19th century introduced black rats, becoming a dangerous invasive species and endangering lava lizard and tortoise populations.

Within the waters surrounding Pinzon Island, plastic pollution is present. Animals mistake the plastic for food and consume it. This problem has threatened the populations of marine wildlife, many of which are endangered, such as the Galapagos sea lion. Due to the harsh environment of the island, the tourism in the island is relatively low compared to the other Galapagos islands. This means that the carbon footprint within the island is considerably smaller than the other Galapagos islands. Overall, Pinzon island’s pollution is quite low in comparison to other places in the world, however it is actively increasing due to plastic waste and illegal fishing. The black rats ‘fed on tortoise eggs’ stunting the population growth of the tortoise. Starting from 2008, scientists flew helicopters over the island and dropped poison pellets aimed to kill the invasive black rat species. Multiple of these trips were made, targeting the infested areas. In December 2012, the rat eradication plan was successful, cementing Pinzon island as a safe conservation space. Additionally, in March of 2016, the Ecuadorian government created a new marine sanctuary, including the waters surrounding Pinzon. These areas have been protected by anti-fishing laws implemented to stop the hunting of fish. Industrial size fishing is strictly prohibited while local artisanal fishermen are given permission to fish. This has significantly increased the local fish population which were previously at risk of endangerment by overfishing.
