= John Van Denburgh =

American zoologist (1872–1924)

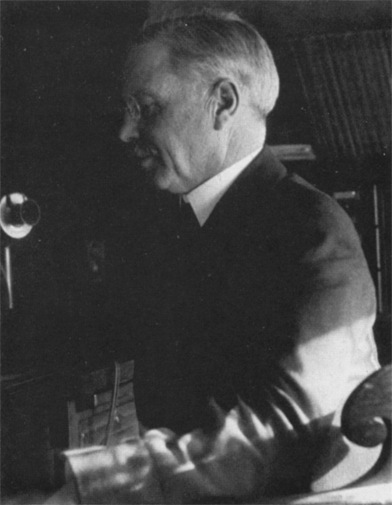
- Born: August 23, 1872; San Francisco, California
- Died: October 24, 1924 (aged 52); Honolulu, Territory of Hawaii, U.S.
- Education: Stanford University, Johns Hopkins University
- Scientific career
- Fields: Herpetology, medicine
- Author abbrev. (zoology): Van Denburgh

John Van Denburgh (Note: He used this form rather than the Dutch form van den Burgh in his publications.) (August 23, 1872 – October 24, 1924) was an American herpetologist from California.

== Biography ==
Van Denburgh was born in San Francisco and enrolled at Stanford University in 1891. As of 1895, he organized the herpetology department of the California Academy of Sciences. In 1897, he received a Ph.D. from Stanford University and earned a M.D. from Johns Hopkins in 1902. Subsequently, he practiced medicine in San Francisco, while again serving as curator of the herpetological collections of the California Academy of Sciences.

After the San Francisco earthquake of 1906 he was instrumental in rebuilding the lost herpetology collections through new expeditions and also acquisitions of other collections. In 1922, he published the two-volume The Reptiles of Western North America.

He died in 1924 while on vacation in Honolulu, Hawaii.

== Taxa named by and in honor of Van Denburgh ==
Van Denburgh discovered and described at least 38 species or reptiles in a series of papers and books published between 1895 and 1922.

Van Denburgh is commemorated in the scientific names of one species and three subspecies of reptiles: Aspodoscelis tigris vandenburghi, Diadophis punctatus vandenburgii, Sceloporus graciosus vandenburgianus, Scincella vandenburghi, and Chelonoidis vandenburghi.
