= Turtle Taxonomy Working Group =

Informal working group of taxonomists

The Turtle Taxonomy Working Group (TTWG) is an informal working group of the IUCN/SSC Tortoise and Freshwater Turtle Specialist Group (TFTSG). It is composed of a number of leading turtle taxonomists, with varying participation by individual participants over the years, some dropping out and others joining.

== Works ==
The TTWG has produced an annual checklist of living and recently extinct turtles since 2007, deliberates on proposed changes to turtle taxonomy, and describes its consideration whether to accept, reject, or suspend adoption of proposed changes in a series of annotations to the checklist. Recent versions of the checklist have included full primary synonymies and citations to all original descriptions of recent turtle taxa, as well as CITES and IUCN Red List status of each species as applicable.
