= Orange Band =

Last confirmed dusky seaside sparrow

- Species: Ammospiza maritima nigrescens
- Sex: Male
- Hatched: St. Johns Unit, Florida, USA
- Died: June 17, 1987 (aged 8–13)
- Known for: Last known dusky seaside sparrow

Orange Band (died June 17, 1987) was the last confirmed dusky seaside sparrow, a subspecies of the seaside sparrow. His death marked the extinction of the dusky seaside sparrow.

== Background ==
Orange Band hatched in the wild marshes of Brevard County, Florida. He belonged to a highly localized subspecies of seaside sparrow first described by ornithologist Charles Maynard in 1872. Unlike other olive-toned coastal sparrows, Orange Band’s population evolved a strikingly dark, heavily streaked blackish-brown plumage to blend into the sand cordgrass marshes near the St. Johns River and Merritt Island.

== Life ==
During Orange Band's lifetime, human activity threatened the species's habitat. The Kennedy Space Center expansion in the 1950s and 60s caused NASA to flood the salt marshes of the local area for mosquito control. This resulted in the flooding of cordgrass, a particular kind of grass that is required for the sparrows to nest. Additionally, highway construction and new subdivisions also led to draining the St. Johns basin.

By 1979, a final sweep of the wild turned up only six surviving dusky seaside sparrows, all of them male. The last known female had vanished in 1975. Orange Band and the five other survivors were captured and brought to Walt Disney World's Discovery Island, where they were kept under a special captive sanctuary program run by the U.S. Fish and Wildlife Service and Audubon coordinators. In captivity, Orange Band was remarkably healthy. He outlived all of his companions, growing old and becoming blind in one eye but continued to attempt to breed.

During following spring breeding seasons, despite the absence of any female companion of his kind, Orange Band would sit on his branch and repeatedly sing his distinctive, buzzing song into the air. Biologists tried to make him fruitful by crossbreeding the remaining males with the closest relative species of Scott's seaside sparrow but this did not produce any positive outcome.

== Death and legacy ==
Orange Band died of natural causes associated with old age on June 17, 1987. His body was preserved and replaced with formalin and located in the scientific research collections of the Florida Museum of Natural History. On December 12, 1990, the dusky seaside sparrow was removed from the endangered species list of the U.S. Fish and Wildlife Service and declared extinct.

== See also ==
- List of individual birds
- Endling
- Booming Ben, the last known heath hen
- George (snail), the last known Achatinella apexfulva
- Incas (parakeet), last known Carolina parakeet
- Lonesome George, the last known Pinta Island tortoise
- Martha (passenger pigeon), the last known passenger pigeon
- Sudan (rhinoceros), the last known northern white rhinoceros
- Toughie (frog), the last known Rabbs' fringe-limbed treefrog
