= TUF =

TUF may refer to:

- Tenant Union Federation
- Transformer utilization factor
- Transcript of unknown function
- The Ultimate Fighter, a reality television series
- The Update Framework, a secure software update framework
- Tours Loire Valley Airport, Tours, France (IATA airport code: TUF)
- The Unforgettable Fire, an album by Irish rock band U2
  - "The Unforgettable Fire" (song), a song from the album above
- "The Ultimate Fling", a song by Finnish rock band Poets of the Fall
- The United Force, a Guyanese political party
- Time-utility function, a mean for real time computing
- Asus TUF (The Ultimate Force), an ASUS brand for affordable, mid-range and low-end gaming products
- The Unifying Force, a Star Wars novel written by James Luceno
- The University of Faisalabad, a private university in Pakistan
- TV-U Fukushima, a television station in Fukushima Prefecture, Japan

== See also ==
- Tuf Borland (born 1998), American football player
- Tuf Voyaging, a 1986 science fiction novel by George R. R. Martin
- Tuff, a type of rock consisting of consolidated volcanic ash
- Tuf or tough iron, a grade of wrought iron
- Tuff (disambiguation)
- Tough (disambiguation)
