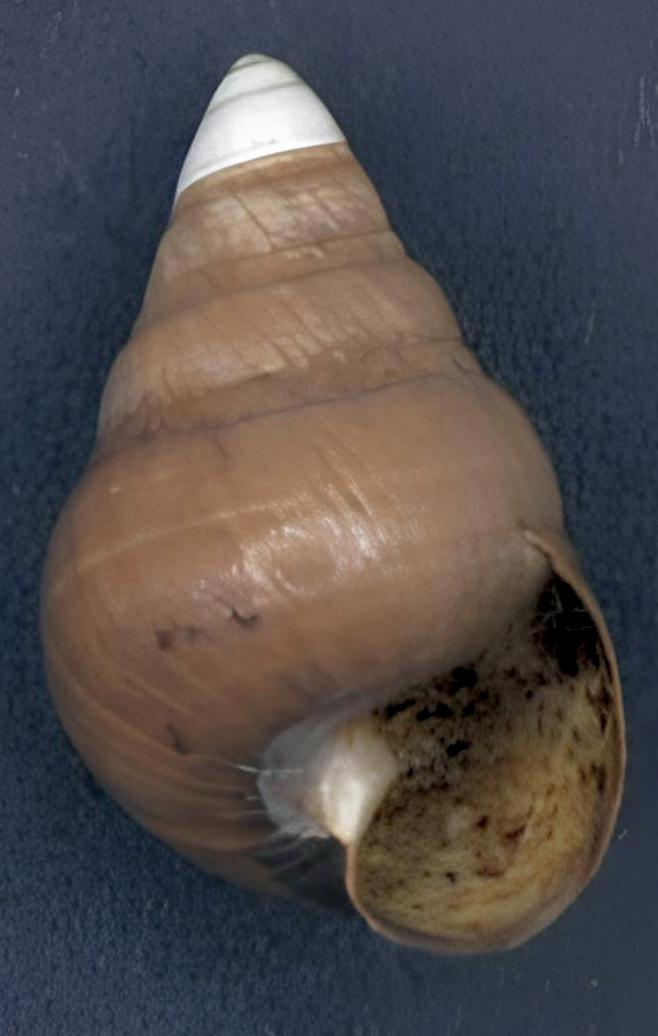
- Empty shell

Conservation status
- Critically endangered, possibly extinct (IUCN 2.3) (Note: Achatinella apexfulva probably went extinct in 2019; however, its IUCN status has not been updated since 1996, and thus remains listed as extinct)

- Presumed Extinct (NatureServe)
- CITES Appendix I

Scientific classification
- Kingdom: Animalia
- Phylum: Mollusca
- Class: Gastropoda
- Order: Stylommatophora
- Family: Achatinellidae
- Genus: Achatinella
- Subgenus: Achatinella
- Species: A. apexfulva

Binomial name
- Achatinella apexfulva (Dixon, 1789)

Synonyms
- List: Achatinella (Achatinella) apexfulva (G. Dixon, 1789) · alternative representation; Achatinella pica Swainson; Helix apexfulva G. Dixon, 1789 superseded combination; Helix lugubris A. Férussac, 1825 junior homonym; Monodonta seminigra Lamarck

= Achatinella apexfulva =

Land snail species in extinct in 2019

Achatinella apexfulva is an extinct species of colorful, tropical, arboreal pulmonate land snail in the family Achatinellidae, once present on Oahu, Hawaii. A. apexfulva is the type species of the genus Achatinella. The specific name, apexfulva, meaning "yellow-tipped", refers to the yellow tip of the snail's shell. Inspired from the taxon, the species has been given common names such as yellow-tipped O'ahu tree snail or Hawaiian yellow-tipped tree snail. The last known member of the species, George, died in captivity in 2019.

== Taxonomy ==
The family Achatinellidae, to which Achatinella apexfulva belongs, represents a diverse adaptive radiation. All species of tree-snail in Hawaii are believed to have come from a single ancestral snail. How that ancestral snail made the 3,800 kilometres (2,400 mi) trip across the ocean is unknown. A longstanding theory is that a bird carried a notably smaller ancestor across the ocean and dropped it on the islands, as bird mediated dispersal has been documented in other snail species. Alternative theories include that it floated across the ocean on a mat of debris, or that it island-hopped across the Pacific in a combination of the theories. Within the Achatinellidae, A. apexfulva belongs to the Oahu clade, which evolved on Oahu island and includes most other members of the genus Achatinella.

== Subspecies ==
A long list
- Achatinella apexfulva alba Sykes, 1900
- Achatinella apexfulva albipraetexta Welch, 1942
- Achatinella apexfulva albofasciata (E. A. Smith, 1873)
- Achatinella apexfulva aloha Pilsbry & C. M. Cooke, 1914
- Achatinella apexfulva apexfulva (G. Dixon, 1789)
- Achatinella apexfulva apicata L. Pfeiffer, 1856
- Achatinella apexfulva aureola Welch, 1942
- Achatinella apexfulva bakeri Welch, 1942
- Achatinella apexfulva bruneola Welch, 1942
- Achatinella apexfulva brunosa Welch, 1942
- Achatinella apexfulva buena Welch, 1942
- Achatinella apexfulva cervixnivea Pilsbry & C. M. Cooke, 1914
- Achatinella apexfulva cestus Newcomb, 1854
- Achatinella apexfulva chromatacme Pilsbry & C. M. Cooke, 1914
- Achatinella apexfulva cinerea Sykes, 1900
- Achatinella apexfulva coniformis (Gulick, 1873)
- Achatinella apexfulva cookei D. D. Baldwin, 1895
- Achatinella apexfulva duplocincta Pilsbry & C. M. Cooke, 1914
- Achatinella apexfulva ewaensis Welch, 1942
- Achatinella apexfulva flavida (Gulick, 1873)
- Achatinella apexfulva flavitincta Welch, 1942
- Achatinella apexfulva forbesiana L. Pfeiffer, 1855
- Achatinella apexfulva fumositincta Welch, 1942
- Achatinella apexfulva fuscostriata Welch, 1942
- Achatinella apexfulva glaucopicta Welch, 1942
- Achatinella apexfulva globosa L. Pfeiffer, 1855
- Achatinella apexfulva griseibasis Welch, 1942
- Achatinella apexfulva gulickii (E. A. Smith, 1873)
- Achatinella apexfulva hanleyana L. Pfeiffer, 1856
- Achatinella apexfulva ihiihiensis Welch, 1942
- Achatinella apexfulva innotabilis (E. A. Smith, 1873)
- Achatinella apexfulva irwini Pilsbry & C. M. Cooke, 1914
- Achatinella apexfulva kahukuensis Pilsbry & C. M. Cooke, 1914
- Achatinella apexfulva kawaiiki Welch, 1942
- Achatinella apexfulva laurani Welch, 1942
- Achatinella apexfulva lemkei Welch, 1942
- Achatinella apexfulva leucorraphe (Gulick, 1873)
- Achatinella apexfulva leucozona (Gulick, 1873)
- Achatinella apexfulva lilacea (Gulick, 1873)
- Achatinella apexfulva lineipicta Welch, 1942
- Achatinella apexfulva meadowsi Welch, 1942
- Achatinella apexfulva muricolor Welch, 1942
- Achatinella apexfulva napus L. Pfeiffer, 1855
- Achatinella apexfulva nigripicta Welch, 1942
- Achatinella apexfulva oioensis Welch, 1942
- Achatinella apexfulva oliveri Welch, 1942
- Achatinella apexfulva ovum L. Pfeiffer, 1857
- Achatinella apexfulva paalaensis Welch, 1942
- Achatinella apexfulva parvicolor Welch, 1942
- Achatinella apexfulva paumaluensis Welch, 1942
- Achatinella apexfulva perplexa Pilsbry & C. M. Cooke, 1914
- Achatinella apexfulva pilsbryi Welch, 1942
- Achatinella apexfulva poamohoensis Welch, 1942
- Achatinella apexfulva polymorpha (Gulick, 1873)
- Achatinella apexfulva punicea Welch, 1942
- Achatinella apexfulva roseata Welch, 1942
- Achatinella apexfulva roseipicta Welch, 1942
- Achatinella apexfulva rubidilinea Welch, 1942
- Achatinella apexfulva rubidipicta Welch, 1942
- Achatinella apexfulva simulacrum Pilsbry & C. M. Cooke, 1914
- Achatinella apexfulva simulans Reeve, 1850
- Achatinella apexfulva simulator Pilsbry & C. M. Cooke, 1914
- Achatinella apexfulva steeli Welch, 1942
- Achatinella apexfulva suturafusca Welch, 1942
- Achatinella apexfulva suturalba Welch, 1942
- Achatinella apexfulva tuberans (Gulick, 1873)
- Achatinella apexfulva versicolor (Gulick, 1873)
- Achatinella apexfulva vespertina D. D. Baldwin, 1895
- Achatinella apexfulva virgatifulva Welch, 1942
- Achatinella apexfulva vittata Reeve, 1850
- Achatinella apexfulva wahiawa Welch, 1942
- Achatinella apexfulva waialaeensis Welch, 1942
- Achatinella apexfulva wailelensis Welch, 1942
- Achatinella apexfulva waimaluensis Welch, 1942

== Description ==
A. apexfulva was a small snail, with a shell measuring 19 mm in length and 12 mm in diameter.

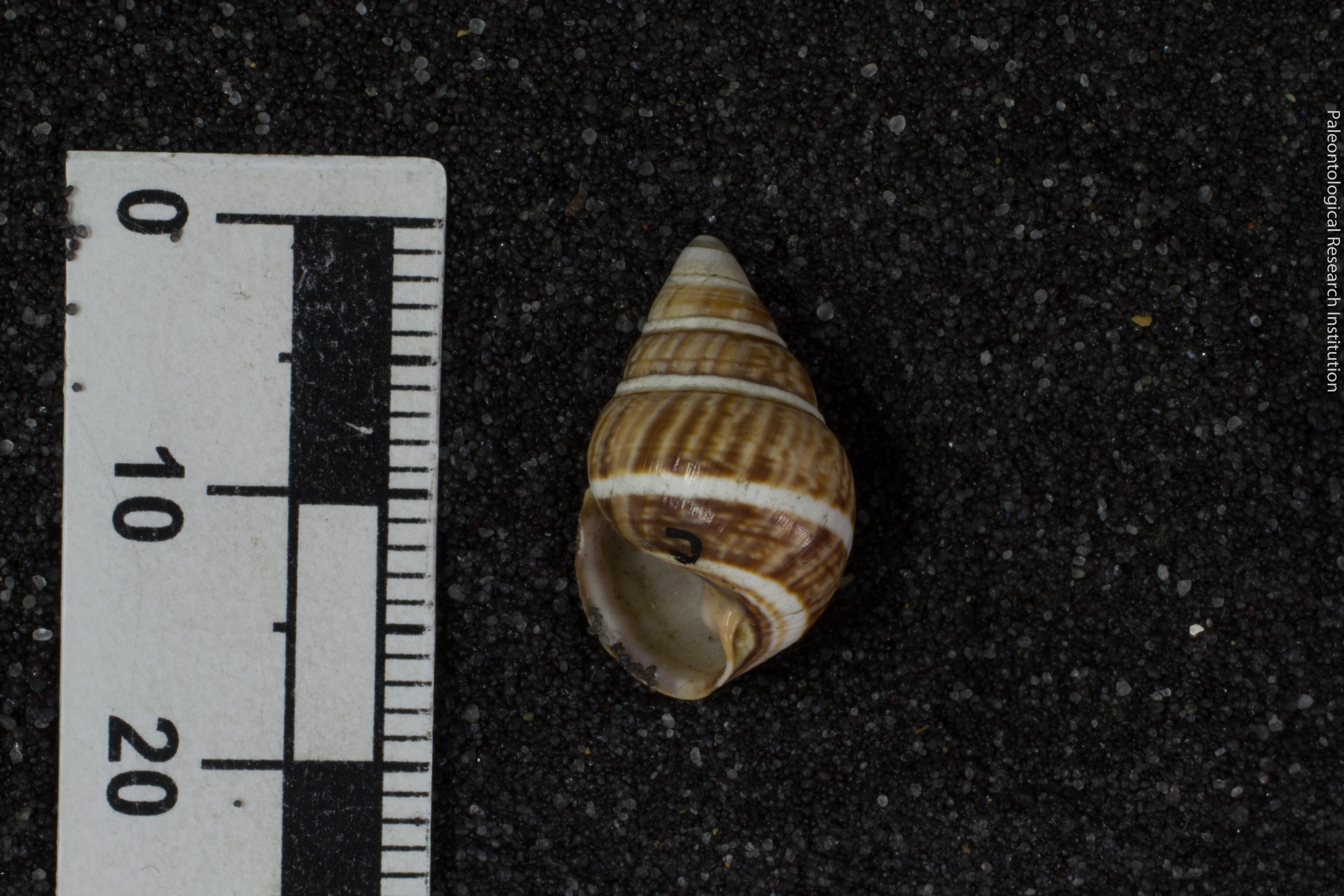
Shell of ''Achatinella apexfulva cestus''

The original description of subspecies A. apexfulva cestus, by Wesley Newcomb, provided:

The shell is solid and ventricose, tapering to a sharp point at the summit. It may be either sinistral or dextral in its spiral and is composed of six rounded whorls. These whorls are corded along their upper edges, and the body whorl is notably tumid, forming the bulk of the structure.

The aperture is subovate in shape, leading to a short columella that features a strong, prominent tubercle. The outer lip is slightly expanded and thickened within.

The coloration of the shell is striking and complex. While the tip is a deep black, the second and third whorls are a clean white. The final three whorls exhibit a range of colors — white, yellowish, or black — often appearing in a mixed pattern. A white cincture traverses the sutures and cuts across the body whorl just below the center, sometimes accompanied by a broader band further down. The surface is occasionally shows bold blotches, black-and-white tessellations, or longitudinal undulating lines. The columella is a rich chestnut brown, a color mirrored on the lip, though the latter is frequently interrupted by splashes of white.

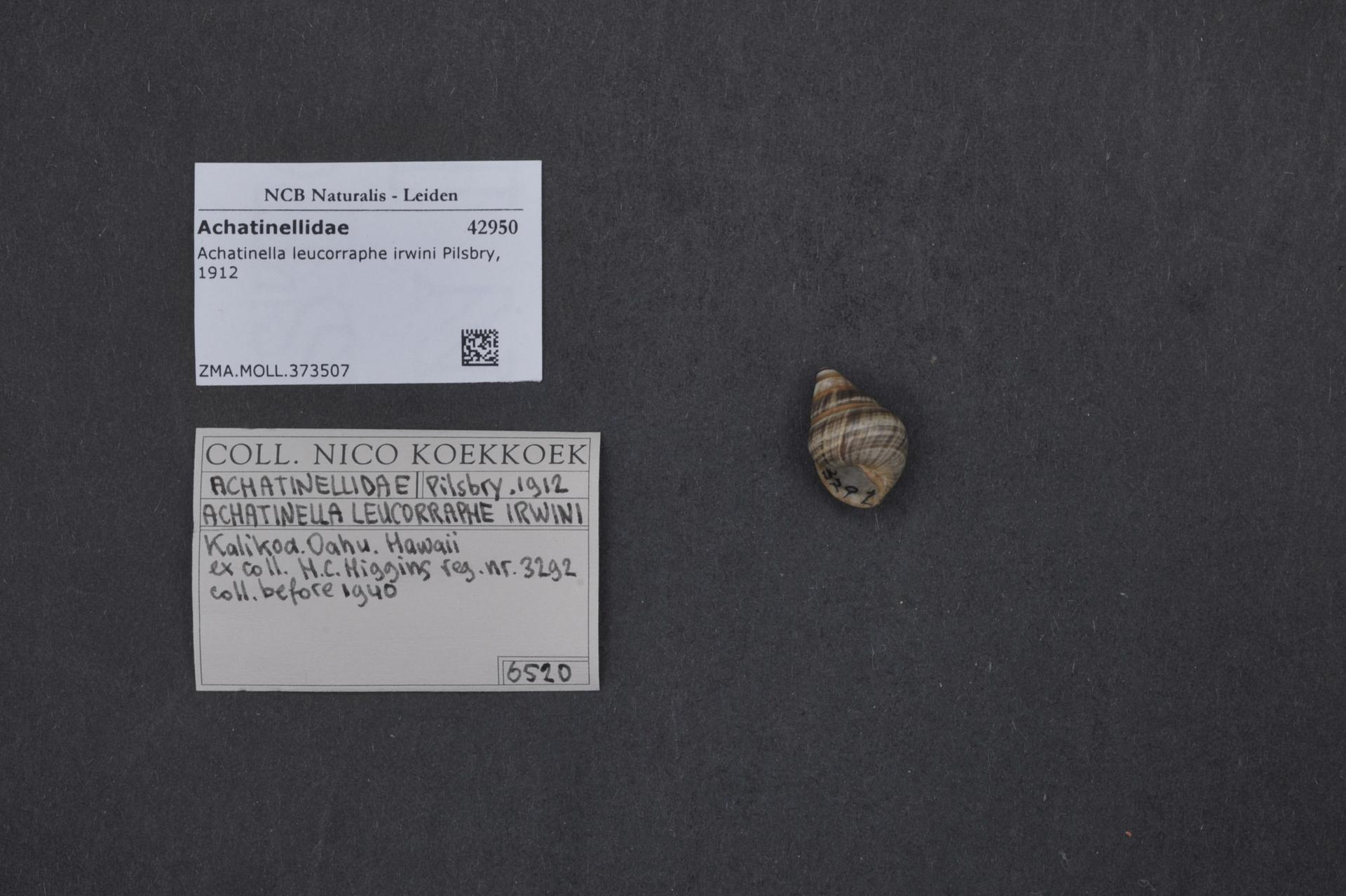
''Achatinella leucorraphe'' (Pilsbry, 1912)

The original description of subspecies A. apexfulva cestus, by J. T. Gulick, provided:

The shell is dextral and shaped into a short, ovate cone. It is marked by fine growth lines rather than spiral striations, giving the surface a distinct texture. The base color is a muted gray, adorned with irregularly interrupted streaks of deep ash-gray and a few indistinct, white spiral lines.The suture is framed by a broad, snowy-white margin. There are 6 1/2 whorls in total; while the apex is blackish, the first four whorls are white and relatively flat, while the remaining whorls are noticeably convex.The aperture is small and shaped somewhat like an ear, revealing a clean white interior. The peristome, or outer lip, is slightly dilated and thickened within. Finally, the columellar fold is large and tinted with a vibrant rose-pink.

== Biology ==
It was a hermaphrodite, having both male and female reproductive organs. They bore live young.

== Ecology ==
While A. apexfulva lived on the leaves of trees, it was not herbivorous. Its diet consisted of algae and mold that it ate off leaves. It lived in small packs. It consumed microscopic algae, fungi and detritis on leaf or bark surfaces. It was sedentary.

== Distribution ==
This species was endemic to forests of the island of Oahu in the Hawaiian archipelago, United States.

== Conservation status ==
A. apexfulva is presumed extinct. It was listed as federally endangered since 1981. A major cause of its population decline in the wild was predation by the rosy wolfsnail. The rosy wolfsnail, a central-American native, was introduced to Hawaii in the 1950s to control agricultural pests. However, as a carnivore of other snails it does not discriminate in its choice of food and has been the cause of at least eight other snail extinctions in Hawaii.

Other causes of the snail's decline included loss of habitat due to deforestation, introduction of rats, and the introduction of Jackson's chameleon. The problems that A. apexfulva faced are not unique: estimated extinction rates in the family Achatinellidae range between 75% and 90%. The International Union for Conservation of Nature's last study on A. apexfulva was conducted in 1996 and listed the species as critically endangered.

In 1997, in response to rapidly dwindling populations, all known remaining specimens of A. apexfulva were collected and bred in captivity. Most offspring died of unknown causes, but one successful offspring was born. This individual was named George, after Lonesome George, a Pinta Island tortoise from the Galapagos Islands who was also the last of his kind. By April 2011, George was the only remaining member of the species. In January 2019, George died at age 14 – leaving the species reportedly extinct.
