= Tuff (disambiguation) =

Tuff is a type of rock consisting of consolidated volcanic ash ejected from vents during a volcanic eruption.

Tuff may also refer to:

- Calcareous tuff, a sedimentary rock
- Tuff (name)
- Tuff (band), an American musical group
- "Tuff" (instrumental), a 1961 single by Ace Cannon
- Turbo Undercover Fighting Force (T.U.F.F.), the title organization in the cartoon T.U.F.F. Puppy
- Tuff, a fictional character from the anime Kirby: Right Back at Ya!
- Tuff TV, digital broadcast television network
- "Tuff", an eye dialect spelling of "tough" used as 2020s slang

== See also ==
- TUF (disambiguation)
- Tough (disambiguation)
- Tuft (disambiguation)
