= Toughie =

Toughie or Toughy may refer to:

- Toughie (frog), the last surviving member of the species Rabbs' fringe-limbed treefrog
- Toughie Brasuhn (1923–1971), American roller derby skater
- Toughy, a character in Grasshopper Island, a 1971 British children's television serial
- Toughy, a character in Martin Morning, a 21st-century French animated television series
- Toughy, a DC Comics character

== See also ==
- Tuffy (disambiguation)
