= Tuffy =

Tuffy is a nickname and a surname. It may refer to:

== People ==
=== Nickname ===
- Earl Abell (1892–1956), American football player
- Harold "Tuffy" Stratton (1920–1994), American football coach
- Tuffy Conn (1892–1973), American football player
- Tuffy Griffiths (1907–1968), American boxer
- Tuffy Gosewisch (born 1983), American baseball player
- Tuffy Knight (born 1936), Canadian football player
- Tuffy Leemans (1912–1979), American football player
- Tuffy Maul (1902–1974), American football player
- Tuffy Nabors (1924–1999), American football player
- Tuffy Neugen (1898–1935), Brazilian footballer
- Tuffy Rhodes (born 1968), American baseball player
- Tuffy Stewart (1883–1934), American baseball player
- Tuffy Stone (born 1962/1963), American chef and TV personality
- Tuffy Thompson (1914–2000), American football player

=== Surname ===
- Dan Tuffy (fl. 1984–present), Australian-born musician, guitarist and vocalist
- Joanna Tuffy (born 1965), Irish politician
- Lil Tuffy (born 1972), American printmaker and designer of popular music posters

== Fictional characters ==
- Nibbles (Tom and Jerry), an orphan mouse also known as Tuffy
- Tuffy Smurf, a character from The Smurfs comic book series
- Tuffy, a minor character in Lady and the Tramp, a 1955 animated film
- Tuffy, in the comic included with Bazooka bubble gum - see Bazooka Joe

== See also ==
- Tuff (disambiguation)
- Toughie (disambiguation), including Toughy
