= Endling =

Last known individual of a species or subspecies

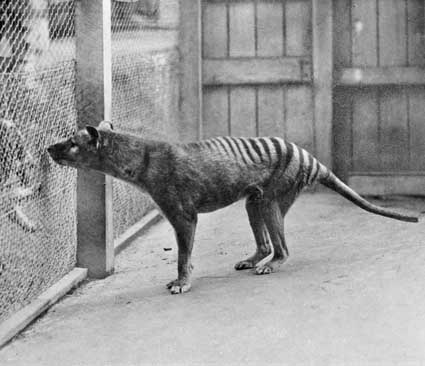
The last known thylacine (Tasmanian tiger), photographed at Hobart Zoo in 1933

An endling is the last known individual of a species or subspecies. Once the endling dies, the species becomes extinct. The word was coined in correspondence in the scientific journal Nature.

== Usage ==
The 4 April 1996 issue of Nature published a correspondence in which commentators suggested that a new word, endling, be adopted to denote the last individual of a species. The 23 May issue of Nature published several counter-suggestions, including ender, terminarch, and relict.

The word endling appeared on the walls of the National Museum of Australia in Tangled Destinies, a 2001 exhibition by Matt Kirchman and Scott Guerin, about the relationship between Australian peoples and their land. In the exhibition, the definition, as it appeared in Nature, was printed in large letters on the wall above two specimens of the extinct Tasmanian tiger: "Endling (n.) The last surviving individual of a species of animal or plant". A printed description of this exhibition offered a similar definition, omitting reference to plants: "An endling is the name given to an animal that is the last of its species."

In The Flight of the Emu: A Hundred Years of Australian Ornithology 1901-2001, author Libby Robin stated that "the very last individual of a species" is "what scientists refer to as an 'endling'".

In 2011, the word was used in the Earth Island Journal, in an essay by Eric Freedman entitled "Extinction Is Forever: A Quest for the Last Known Survivors". Freedman defined endling as "the last known specimen of her species." In "The Sense of an Endling", author Helen Lewis describes the notion of an endling as poignant, and the word as "wonderfully Tolkien-esque". Author Eric Freedman describes endling as "a word with finality", stating, "It is deep-to-the-bone chilling to know the exact date a species disappeared from Earth. It is even more ghastly to look upon the place where it happened and know that nobody knew or cared at the time what had transpired and why."

The word was also used as the title of a 2022 video game, Endling: Extinction Is Forever, which portrays the survival story of the last fox family in a world affected by environmental destruction. Endling is also the title of a 2025 novel by Ukrainian-Canadian author Maria Reva, which juxtaposes a Ukrainian woman's quest to keep endangered land snails alive with Russia's 2022 invasion of Ukraine.

== Notable endlings ==
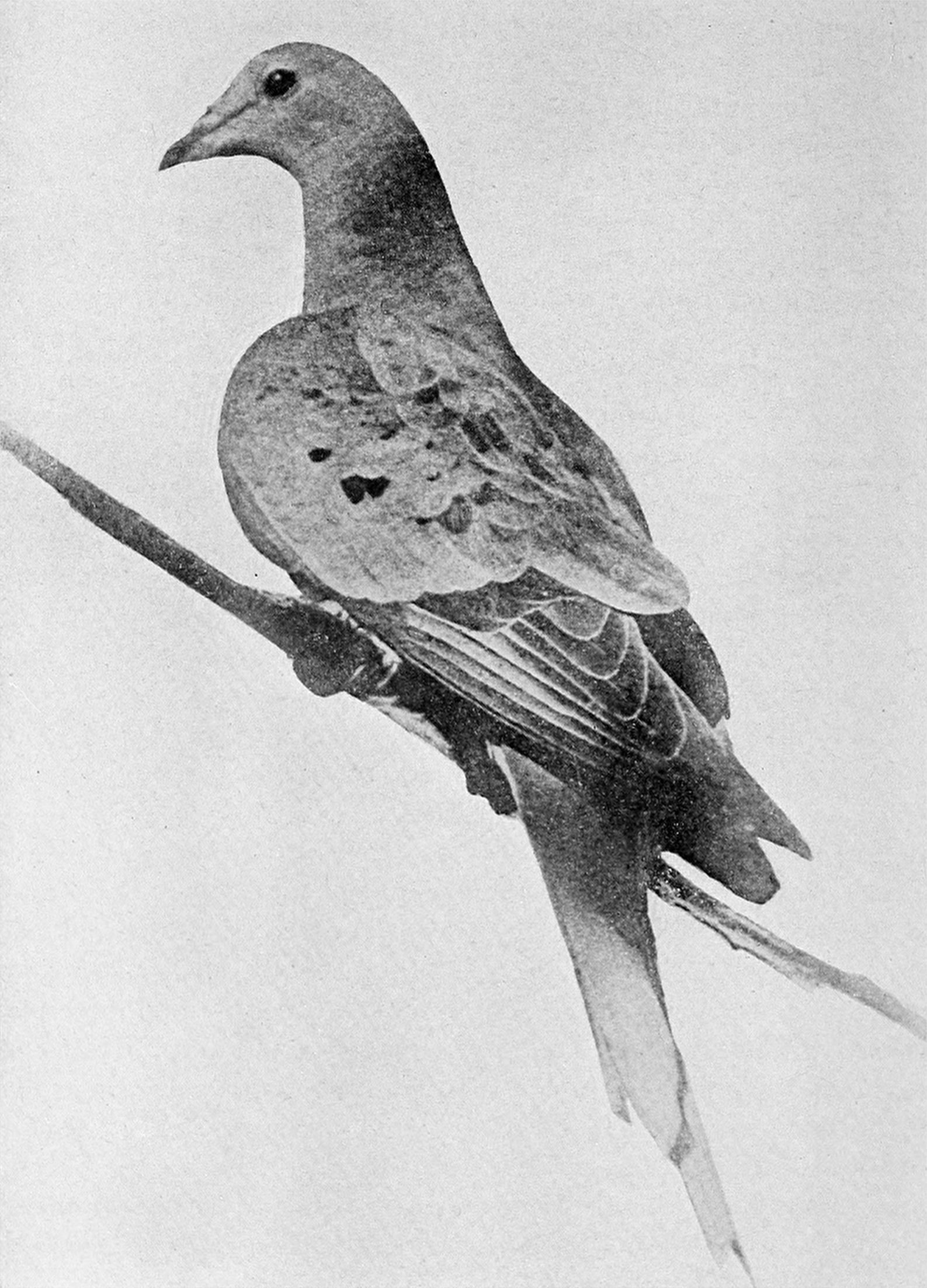
Martha, the last passenger pigeon, died in the Cincinnati Zoo on September 1, 1914.

This is not a comprehensive list of contemporary extinction, but a list of high-profile, widely publicised examples of when the last individual of a species was known.

=== Birds ===
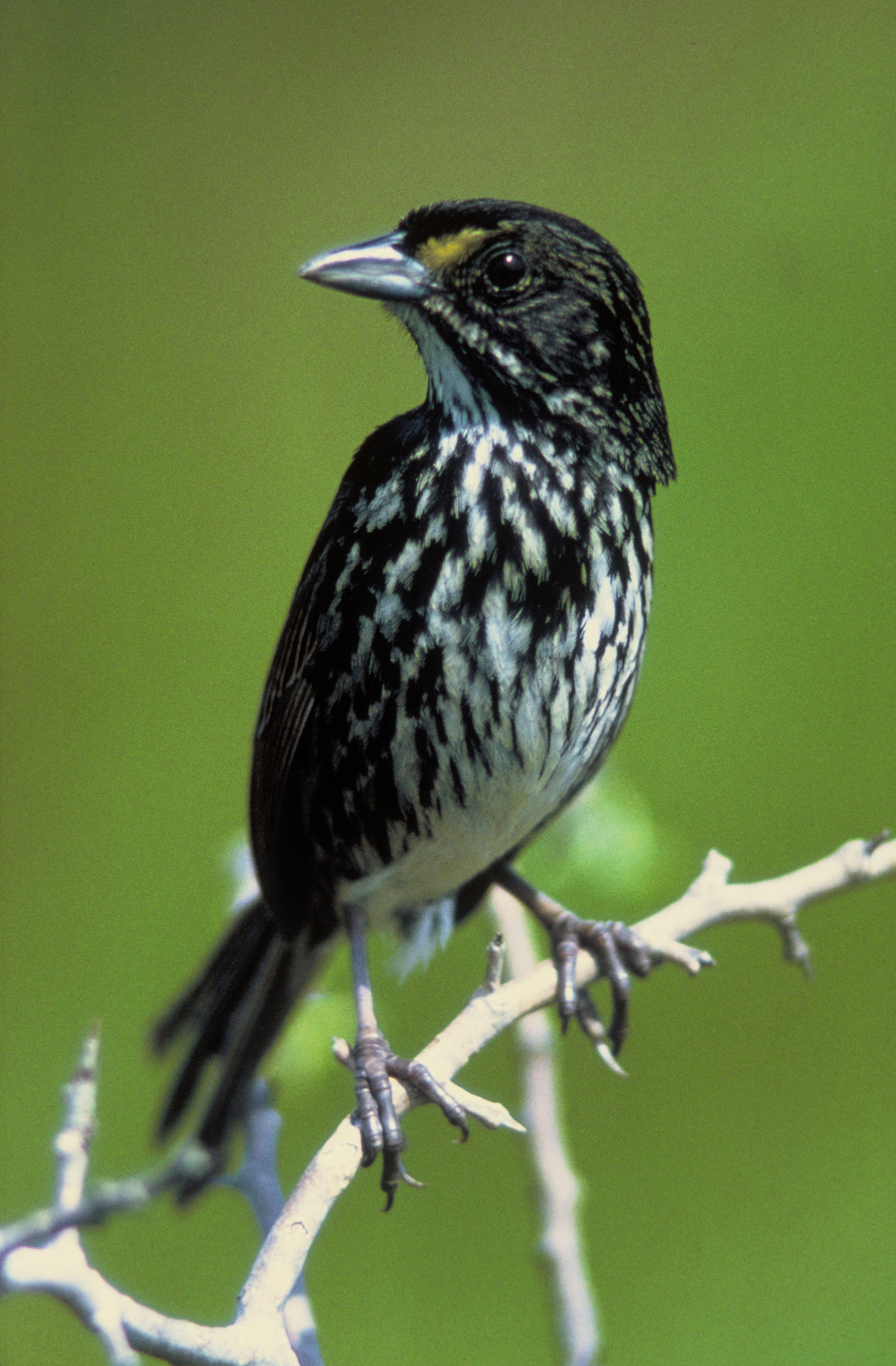
A dusky seaside sparrow (Ammospiza maritima nigrescens), officially declared extinct in 1990

- Martha, the last known passenger pigeon (Ectopistes migratorius), died at the Cincinnati Zoo at 1 PM on 1 September 1914, marking the extinction of the species.
- Incas, the last known Carolina parakeet (Conuropsis carolinensis), died, also at the Cincinnati Zoo (and in the same cage as Martha), on 21 February 1918. He died within one year of his mate, Lady Jane.
- Booming Ben, a solitary heath hen (Tympanuchus cupido cupido), was last seen 11 March 1932 on Martha's Vineyard, Massachusetts.
- Orange Band, the last known dusky seaside sparrow (Ammospiza maritima nigrescens), died on 17 June 1987 at the Discovery Island zoological park at Walt Disney World Resort, marking the extinction of the subspecies.
- The last known Kauaʻi ʻōʻō (Moho braccatus) was recorded singing a mating call on Kauai in 1987 by David Boynton. The bird is believed to have been killed by Hurricane Iniki in 1992, and the death of this individual also marked the extinction of the entire Mohoidae family.

=== Mammals ===
- In 1627, the last aurochs (Bos primigenius), an ancestor of bovine and cattle, died in a forest near what is now Jaktorów in modern-day Poland.
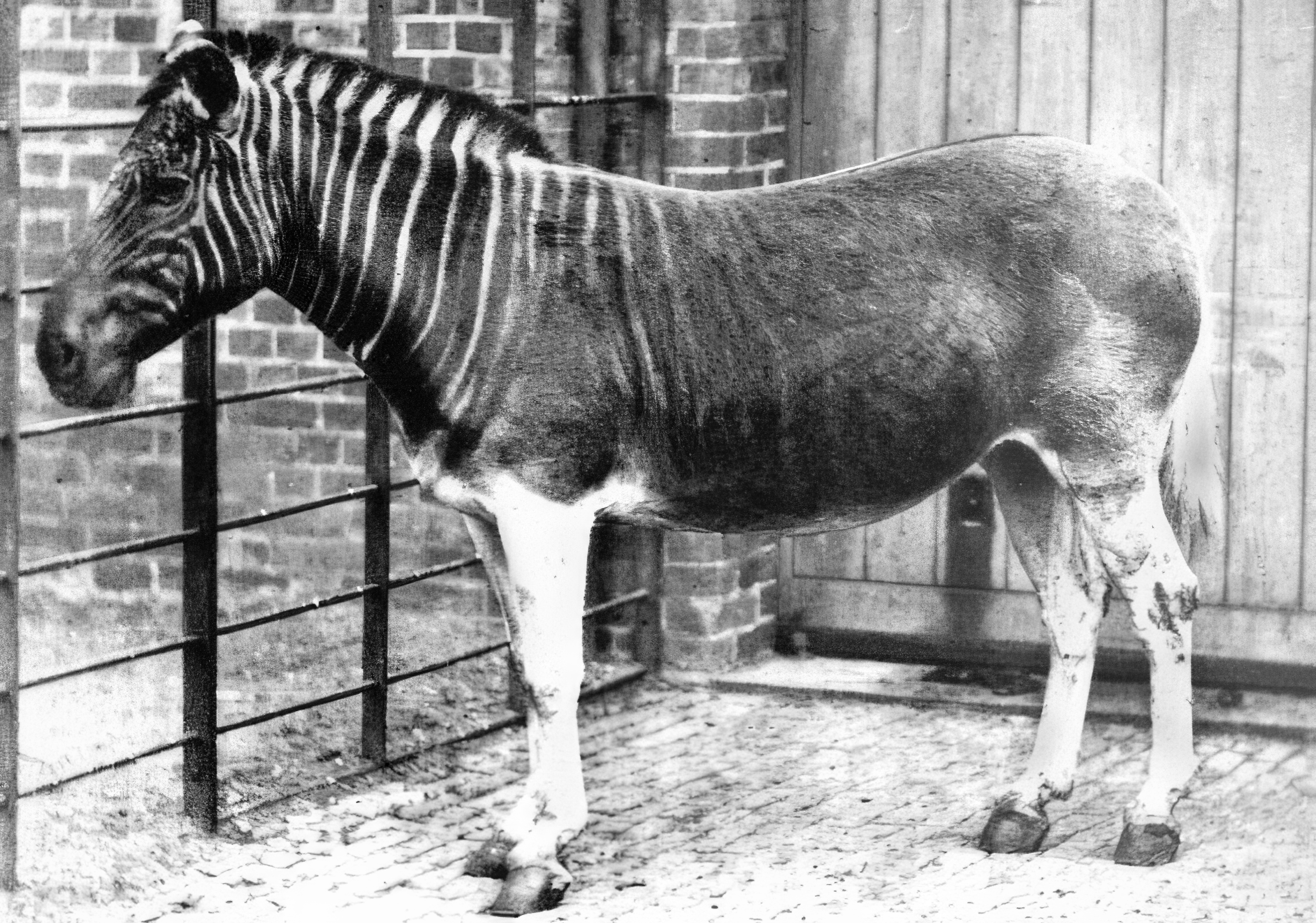
  A quagga mare at the London Zoo in 1870. This is the only specimen photographed alive.
- The quagga (Equus quagga quagga) became extinct in the wild in the late 1870s due to hunting for meat and skins, and the subspecies' endling died in captivity on 12 August 1883 at the Artis in Amsterdam.
- The final tarpan (Equus ferus ferus) died in captivity in the Russian Empire in 1903.
- On 7 September 1936, the last known captive thylacine (Thylacinus cynocephalus), also called Tasmanian tiger, died in Hobart Zoo, following persecution of the species through hunting and trapping. Information published about this individual has been conflicted throughout the decades following its death. Frank Darby, who falsely claimed to have worked at the Hobart Zoo, invented the myth this thylacine was named "Benjamin", and the claim was rapidly circulated by media and persists to the present--even being repeated on Wikipedia itself. Other areas of contention include where this thylacine was captured and by whom, whether it was neglected in its zoo enclosure and even whether it was the last known surviving thylacine. Researchers Robert Paddle and Kathryn Medlock argue that the endling was female and died of neglect. Gareth Linnard says that the specimen was not called Benjamin, but was male and died of old age, having been well-treated due to its valued status in the zoo's collection. Regardless of its sex, the thylacine at Hobart Zoo is the last reputably-verified specimen of not only its species and genus, but also the entire family Thylacinidae. However, scientist Barry Brook and his colleagues argue that the weight of evidence supports the thylacine probably persisting in the wild for several decades following the 1936 death of the Hobart Zoo animal.
- The last known Mexican grizzly bear (Ursus arctos horribilis), also called oso plateado (silver bear) in Spanish, was shot in 1976 in Sonora, Mexico.

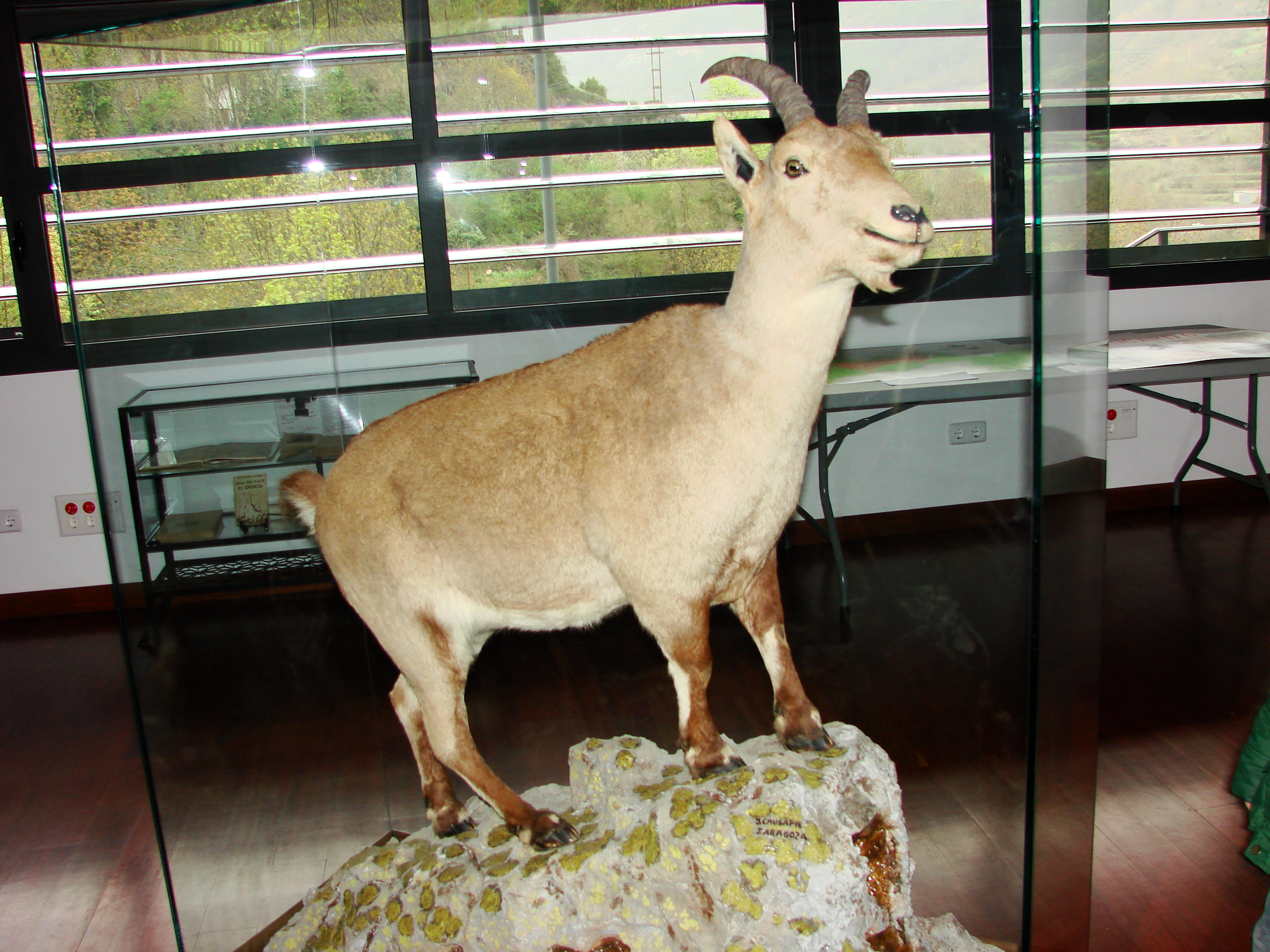
Taxidermised body of Celia, the final Pyrenean ibex

- Celia, the last Pyrenean ibex (Capra pyrenaica pyrenaica), was found crushed by a tree on 6 January 2000 in the Spanish Pyrenees, after hunting and competition from livestock reduced the population to one individual.
- The final Vietnamese Javan rhinoceros (Rhinoceros sondaicus annamiticus), was shot by a poacher at the Cát Tiên National Park in 2010, after habitat loss, poaching, and the Vietnam War reduced the population to one individual.

=== Reptiles and amphibians ===
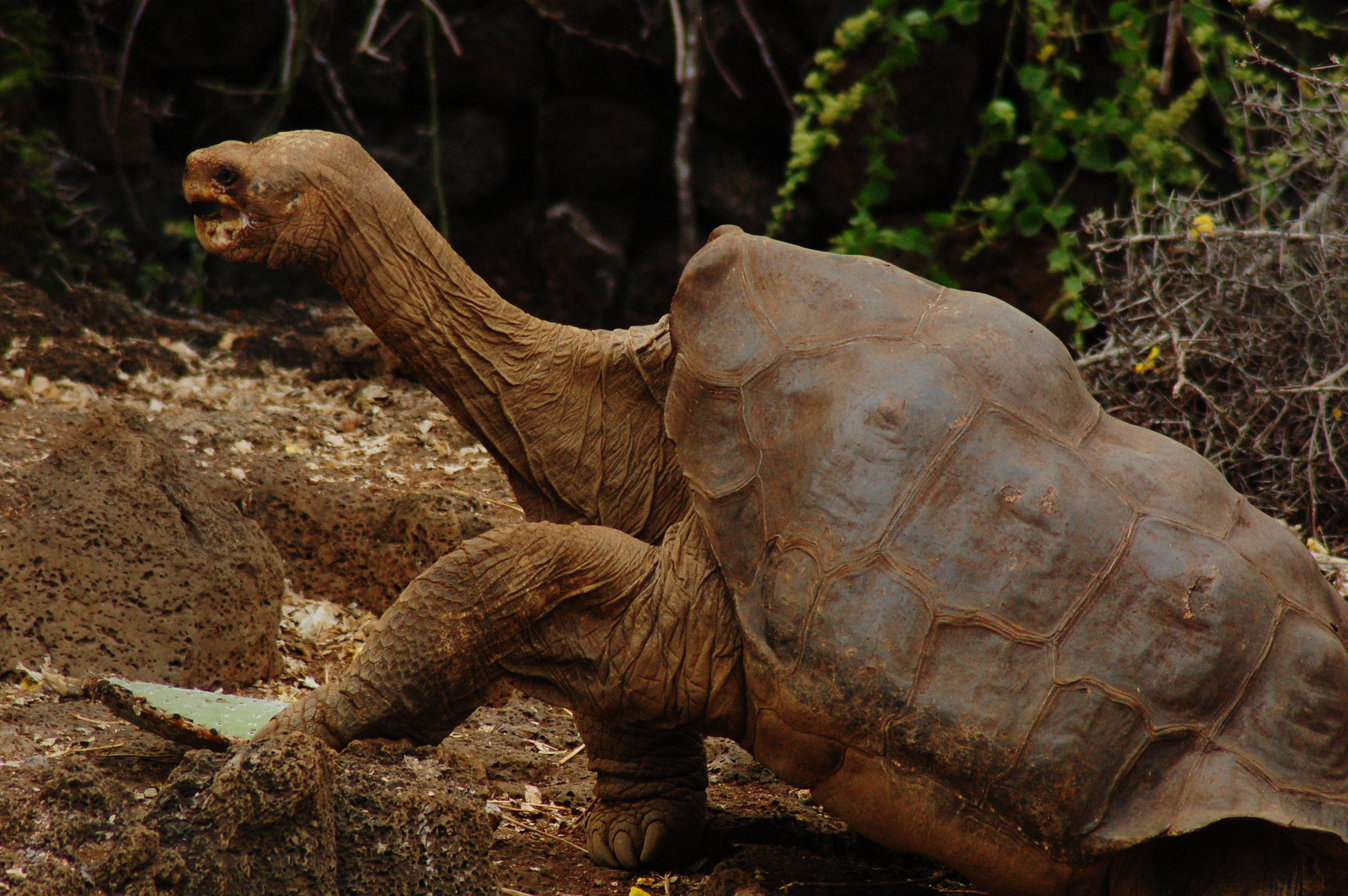
Lonesome George, the last Pinta Island tortoise

- On 24 June 2012, Lonesome George, the last known Pinta Island tortoise (Chelonoidis niger abingdonii), died in his habitat in the Galápagos Islands.
- On 26 September 2016, Toughie, the last known Rabbs' fringe-limbed treefrog (Ecnomiohyla rabborum), died in the Atlanta Botanical Garden.
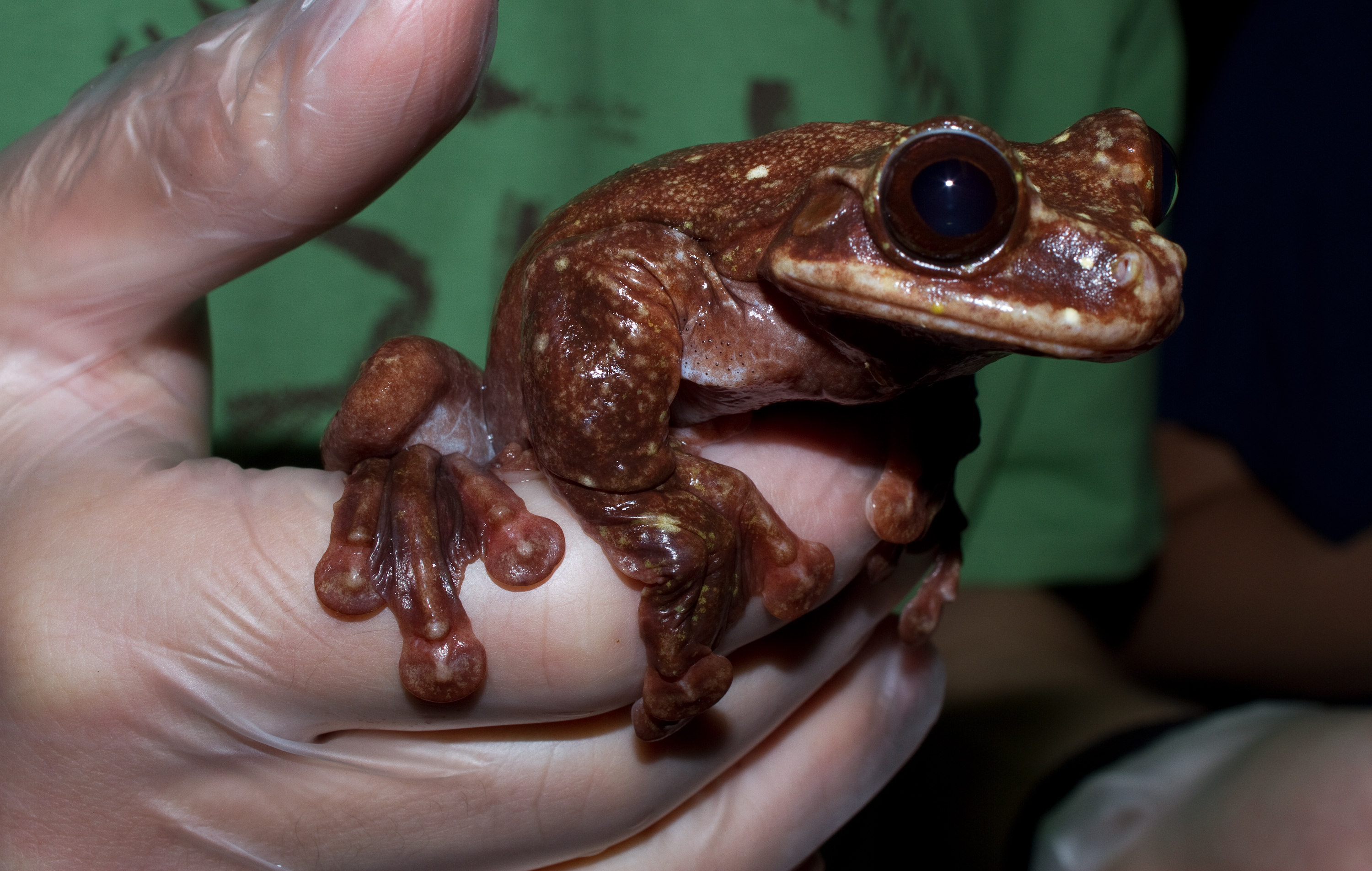
  'Toughie', the last known Rabb's fringe-limbed treefrog
- After being considered possibly extinct for 113 years, a Fernandina Island Galápagos tortoise named Fernanda was found in 2019 for the Animal Planet series, Extinct or Alive. However, she is the only living individual known, making Fernanda an endling.

=== Invertebrates ===
- Turgi was the last Partula clarkei, a Polynesian tree snail, who died on 31 January 1996 in the London Zoo.
- A tank in the Bristol Zoo was the last refuge of Partula faba, a land snail from Ra'iātea in French Polynesia. The population dropped from 38 in 2012 to one in 2015. The last individual died on 21 February 2016.
- George was the last known individual of the Oahu tree snail species Achatinella apexfulva. He died on January 1, 2019, in captivity near Kailua, Hawaii.

=== Plants ===
- The Curepipe Botanic Gardens in Mauritius have housed the last specimen of the palm Hyophorbe amaricaulis since the 1950s.
- Only one living specimen of the tree species Madhuca diplostemon is known to exist.
- Some ancient seeds, dated to between 993-1202 AD, were found in an archaeological excavation in the Judean desert in 1986–87. In 2009, a specimen of an unknown species of Commiphora, informally named "Sheba", was successfully sprouted from one of these seeds. In 2024, it was tentatively identified as tsori or Judean balsam, on the basis of taxonomy and resin properties matching ancient descriptions.

== See also ==
- Conservation status
- De-extinction
- Extinction
- Holocene extinction
- Lists of extinct animals
- Rare species
- Terminal speaker
