= Life Cairn =

The Life Cairn is a type of public memorial built around the world for species rendered extinct by human activity. It takes the form of a cairn. The first Life Cairn was raised on Mount Caburn, near Lewes in East Sussex. The inaugural opening ceremony was held on 22 May 2011. A Life Cairn was dedicated to Lonesome George at the Galapagos National Park on 26 July 2012 and an additional Life Cairn is being raised in Stockholm.

The Life Cairn memorial programme was started by BBC TV presenter Reverend Peter Owen Jones, known for his TV series Around the World in 80 Faiths and Andreas Kornevall, the Director for the environmental charity, the Earth Restoration Service (Registered Charity No. 1118951).
