= Booming Ben =

Last known heath hen

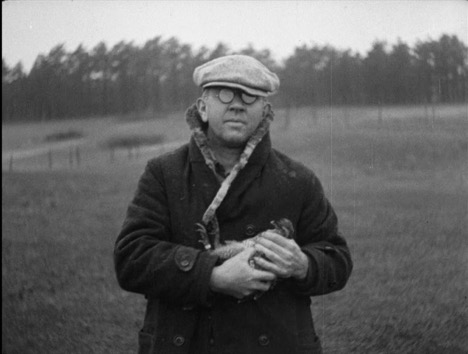
- Alfred Otto Gross holding Booming Ben
- Species: Tympanuchus cupido cupido
- Sex: Male
- Hatched: c. 1924; Martha's Vineyard, Massachusetts, US
- Died: Last spotted in March 11, 1932 (aged 7–8)
- Known for: Last known Heath Hen

Booming Ben (c. 1924 – March 11, 1932) was the last confirmed heath hen, a subspecies of the greater prairie chicken. He was last spotted on Martha's Vineyard in the US state of Massachusetts on March 11, 1932. His death marked the extinction of the heath hen.

== Background ==
Heath hens experienced significant population decline due to hunting practices during the colonial period, with all remaining birds on Martha's Vineyard by 1870, despite their prior range across the East Coast of the United States. Ornithologists began tracking the population in 1908.

With conservation efforts, the population grew from 100 to around 2,000 by 1916. However, a 1916 fire dropped the population down to 150, with many of the surviving birds being male. The following years included a particularly harsh winter, followed by spread of disease among the Heath hen population. Additionally, the small population led to inbreeding, resulting in genetic issues that left many birds infertile.

In 1925, the Federation of the Bird Clubs of New England proffered $2,000 annually toward conservation efforts. However, by the beginning of 1927, only 11 males and 2 females remained. By the fall of 1928, only two males remained, with only Booming Ben surviving as of December of that year.

== Death ==
Despite his name, Booming Ben was silent in the final years of his life. Gross attempted to mate Booming Ben with a Wisconsin prairie chicken to no avail. Many expected him to die before 1930. Before Ben's death, American ornithologist Alfred Otto Gross of Bowdoin College and American conservationist Thornton W. Burgess attached an identification tag to his leg. Booming Ben was last seen on March 11, 1932. After failing to appear for multiple seasons, Gross offered a $100 reward for the recovery of Ben's body.

Footage of Booming Ben recorded by Alfred Otto Gross in the early 1930s was digitized in 2017; it is available from the Bowdoin College special collections.

Booming Ben has been memorialized in the 2024 children's book The Last Heath Hen: An Extinction Story, written by Christie Palmer Lowrance and illustrated by Michael Berndt. Additionally, a sculpture of Booming Ben has been erected where he was last seen off a bike path in the Manuel F. Correllus State Forest. It is one of five statues as a part of Todd McGrain's Lost Bird Project.

== See also ==
- List of individual birds
- Endling
- George (snail), the last known Achatinella apexfulva
- Incas (parakeet), last known Carolina parakeet
- Lonesome George, the last known male Pinta Island tortoise
- Martha (passenger pigeon), the last known passenger pigeon
- Sudan (rhinoceros), the last known male Northern White rhinoceros
- Toughie (frog), the last known Rabbs' fringe-limbed treefrog
