= Galápagos National Park =

National park in Ecuador

- IUCN category II (national park)
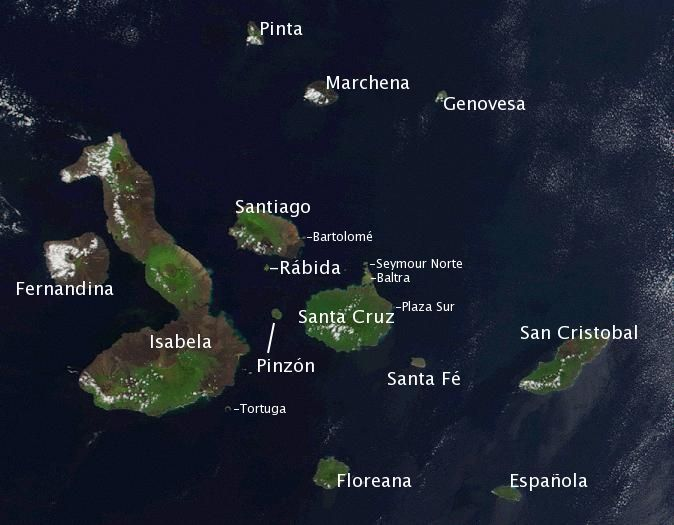
- Satellite photo of the Galápagos islands overlaid with the Spanish names of the visible main islands.
- Interactive map of Galápagos National Park
- Location: Ecuador; Galápagos Islands
- Coordinates: 0°20′0″S 90°0′0″W
- Area: 7,995.4 km^{2} (3,087.0 sq mi)
- Established: 4 July 1959

Galápagos National Park (Spanish: Parque Nacional Galápagos) was established in 1959. It began operation in 1968, and it is Ecuador's first national park and a UNESCO World Heritage Site.

== Park history ==
The government of Ecuador has designated 97% of the land area of the Galápagos Islands as the country's first national park. The remaining 3% is distributed between the inhabited areas of Santa Cruz, San Cristóbal, Baltra, and Isabela.

In 1971, the Galápagos National Park Service had its first Superintendent, 2 officers and 6 park rangers on Santa Cruz Island. In 1974, the Galápagos National Park Service had its first management plan and a team of officials in accordance with the organic structure issued in 1973, with a Superintendent, 2 conservation officers, 40 park rangers to comply with management objectives. On Santa Cruz is the Charles Darwin Research Station.

In 1979, UNESCO declared the Galápagos Islands Natural Heritage for Humanity, making the Park Service through the Superintendent of the Park responsible for performing permanent park conservation and guarding the islands.

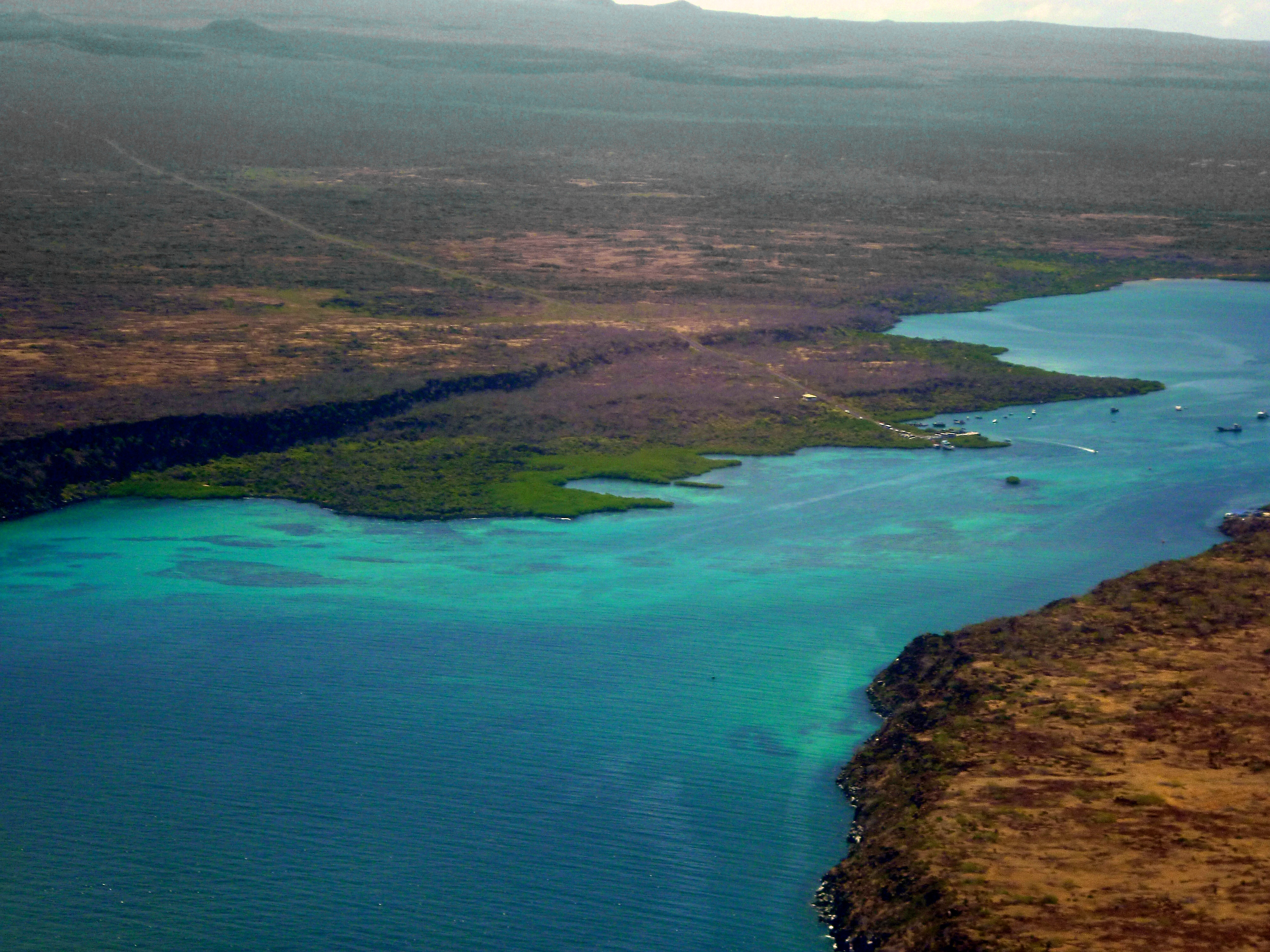
Islands of Santa Cruz (left) and Baltra (right).

The photo on the left is the Itabaca Channel and is located between two islands in the Galápagos, Ecuador. Looking at the aerial photo, Baltra Island, also known as South Seymour Island, is on the right and Santa Cruz Island is on the left. The Itabaca Channel is used by water taxis who take people from Baltra to Santa Cruz. The Galápagos Marine Reserve was created in 1986. Additionally, the same year, the Galápagos National Park was included in the list of Biosphere Reserve because of its unique scientific and educational worth that should be preserved for perpetuity.

A UNESCO mission arrived in Galapagos on 29 April to study the progress made since 2007. A favorite of visitors to the Galapagos is Tortuga Bay, located on the Santa Cruz Island, about a 20-minute walk from the main water taxi dock in Puerto Ayora. The walking path is 1.55 miles (2,490 m) and is open from six in the morning to six in the evening. Visitors must sign in and out at the start of the path with the Galapagos Park Service office. Marine iguanas, galapagos crabs and birds are seen dotted along the lava rocks in Tortuga Bay. There is a separate cove where you can swim where it is common to view white tip reef sharks swimming in groups, small fish, birds, and sometimes the gigantic galápagos tortoise.

In 2007, the UNESCO added the Galapagos National Park to its List of World Heritage Sites in Danger, reflecting the dangers posed by a fast pace of human development in all its areas: immigration, tourism and trade, all increasing the likelihood of introduction of invasive species to the islands. This represents the gravest danger to the fragile ecosystems which have evolved over millions of years in natural isolation.

== Biological characteristics ==
=== Ecosystems and vegetation cover ===
The vegetation of the islands is distributed through the zoning of plant species that during the formation and evolution of the archipelago have colonized different areas; they are also the result of the incidence of climate such as winds from the southeast that have led to an increase in rainfall in the highlands to the south of the archipelago. The amount of rain that falls determines the formation of ecosystems ranging from deciduous scrubland to evergreen forests to shrub and wet herbaceous zones. Seven zones have been identified in the archipelago, these zones are distributed heterogeneously among islands; Santa Cruz Island has seven and San Cristóbal Island has four. In the archipelago there are seven zones.

=== Littoral zone ===
The type of coastline conditions the species composition; they are distributed as patches with a total area of ~1000 ha. This zone has mangroves; the red mangrove (Rizophora magle) is exposed to tidal levels and the black mangrove (Avicenia germinans) is generally flooded by surface water. The boundary between water and land is dominated by white mangrove (Laguncularia racemosa) and jeli (Conocarpus erectus), which acts as a transition to the terrestrial vegetation system.

Some of the salt-tolerant herbaceous plants that grow near the coasts are Sesuvium portulacastrum, the endemic Sesuvium edmonstonei, and Ipomoea pescaprae, scorpion's tail (Heliotropium curassacicum), montesalado (Cryptocarpus pyriformis), rompeollas or arrayancillo (Maytenus octogona), barilla (Batis maritima, Portulaca howellii), manzanillo (Hippomane mancinella), the latter has coevolved with turtles, since the germination of its seeds occurs when they are ingested by these reptiles.

=== Arid Zone ===
Most of the Galapagos is arid, and hosts drought-tolerant herbaceous plants such as castela (Castela galpageia), caco (Erythrina velutina), muyuyo (Cordia lutea), palo verde (Parkinsonia aculeata, Phoradendron henslowii), a hemiparasite that lives in association with Galapagos cotton; Macraea laricifolia and Scalesia affinis.

=== Transition Zone ===
These are intermediate environments between the Scalesia zone and the arid zone, with a greater amount of epiphytes and lichens. Characteristic plants include matazarno (Piscidia cathagenensis), a native species exploited for its strong wood; pomarrosa (Syzygium jambos), a 15 m cultivated tree; Senna occidentalis and Rhynchosia minima, the latter, a vine typically found in disturbed sites and near roads. Garúa fogs keep this zone humid during the dry season.

=== Scalesia Zone ===
From 300-500 m altitude, the stratum dominated by Scalesia spp. is evident.

=== Parda Zone ===
Zanthoxylum fagara is the most abundant, mainly above Scalesia but below Micronia acting partially as a transition within the wet zone species.

== Conservation ==
Conservation International Ecuador has been implementing a Global Environment Facility project focused on strengthening biosecurity in the park and supporting ecosystem restoration measures, including invasive-vertebrate eradication on Floreana Island and the translocation of giant tortoises to Santa Fe Island.

== Gallery ==
Protected wildlife and areas
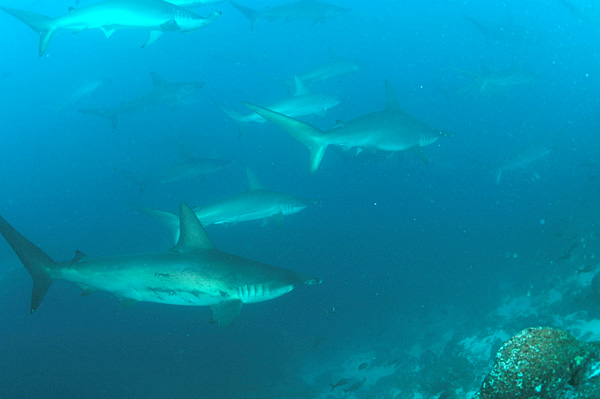
School of scalloped hammerheads at Wolf Island in the Galapagos Islands

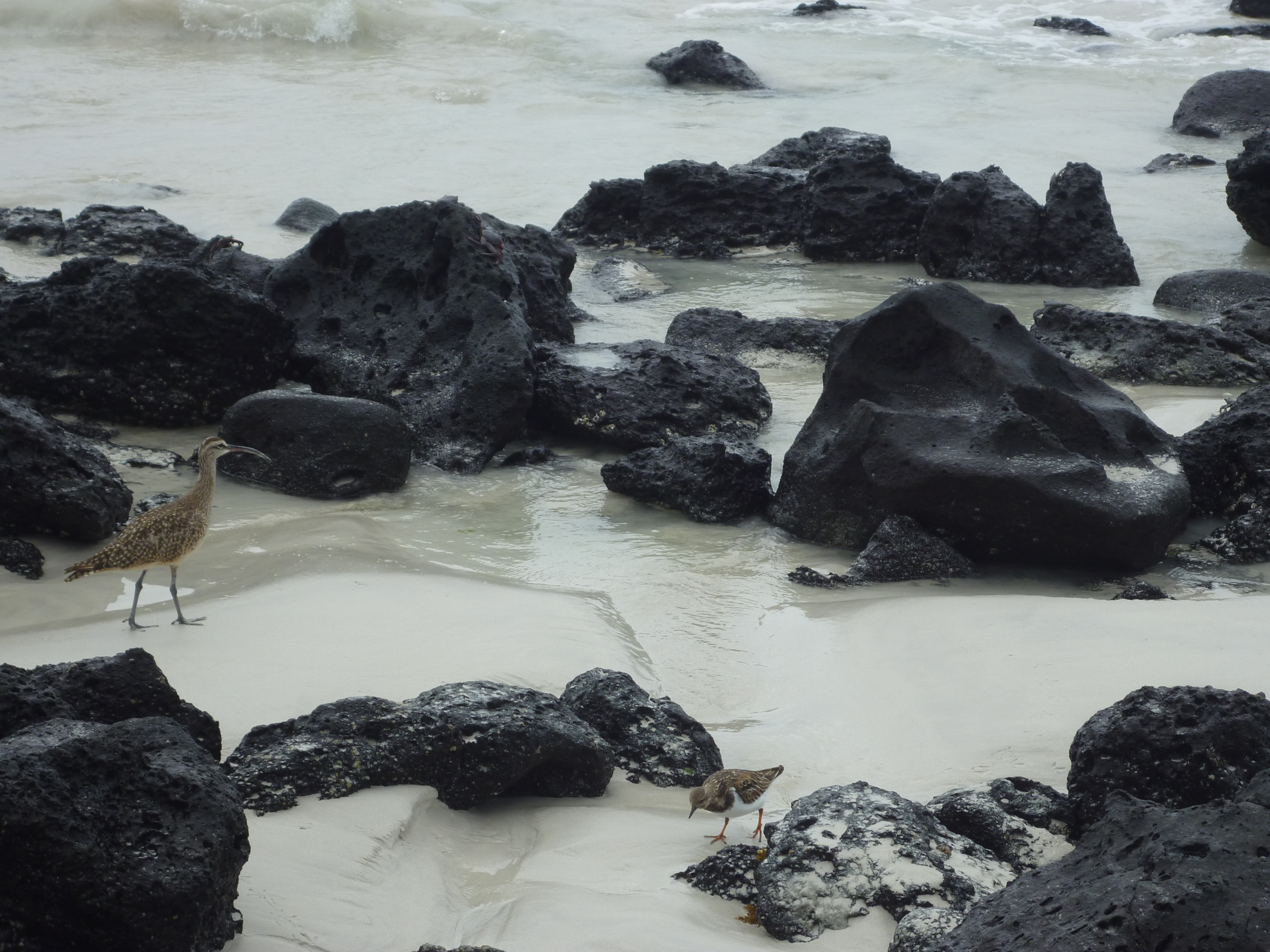
Birds in the water at Tortuga Bay

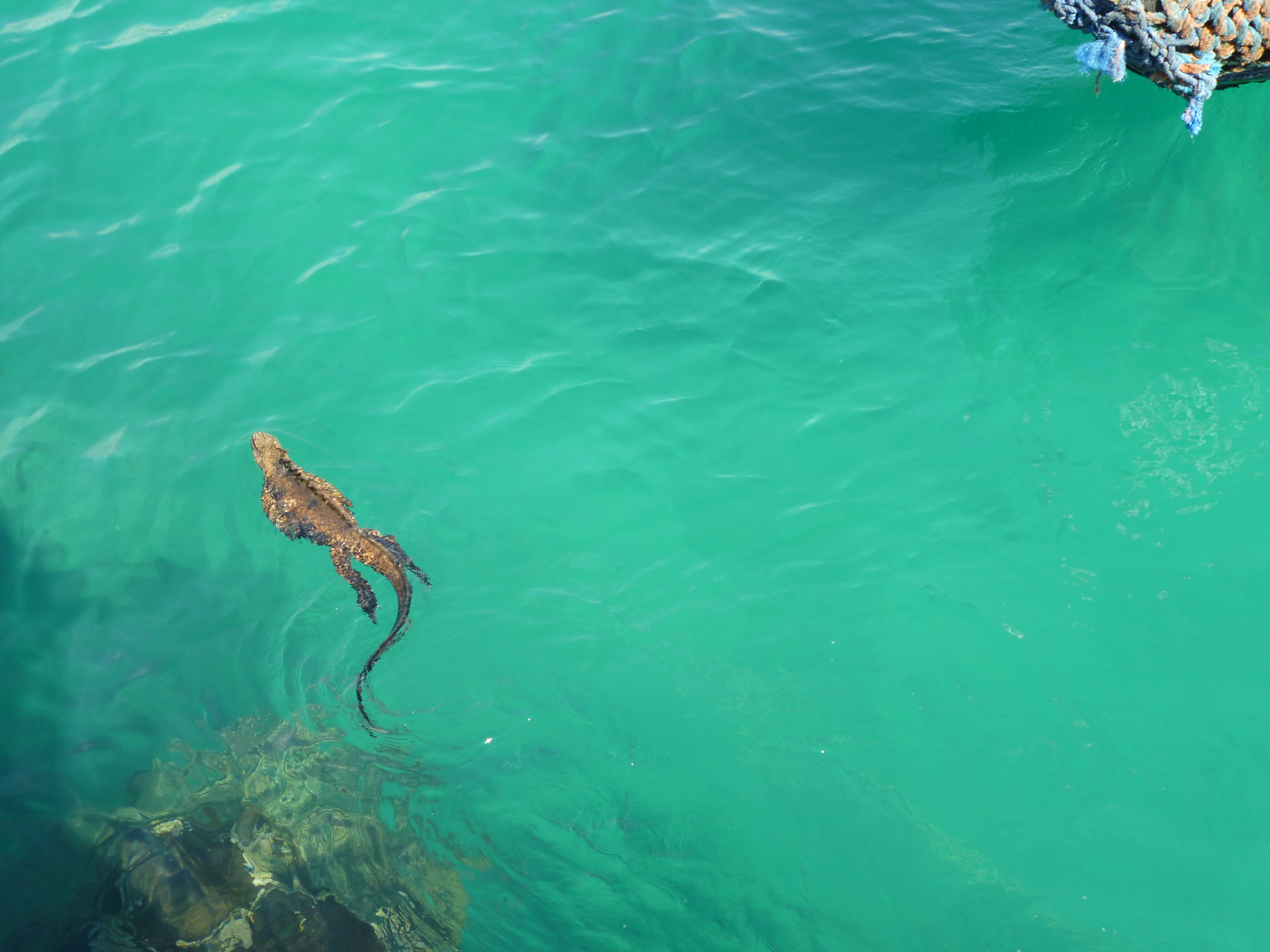
The marine iguana (Amblyrhynchus cristatus) Galápagos Islands Santa Cruz - swimming in Puerto Ayora

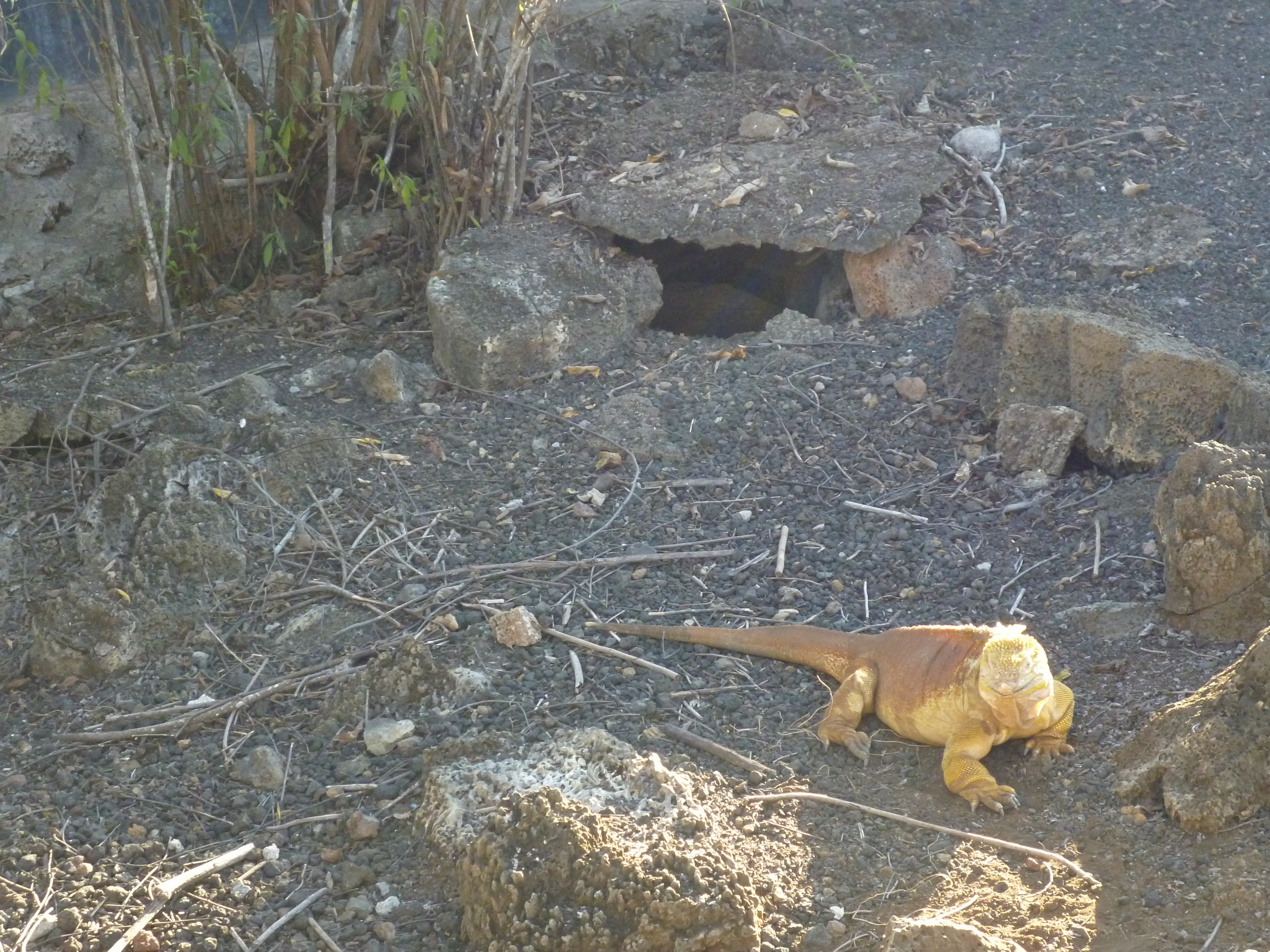
A breeding program in the Galapagos for Yellow Land Iguana living (pictured here living at the Charles Darwin Research Station, Puerto Ayora)

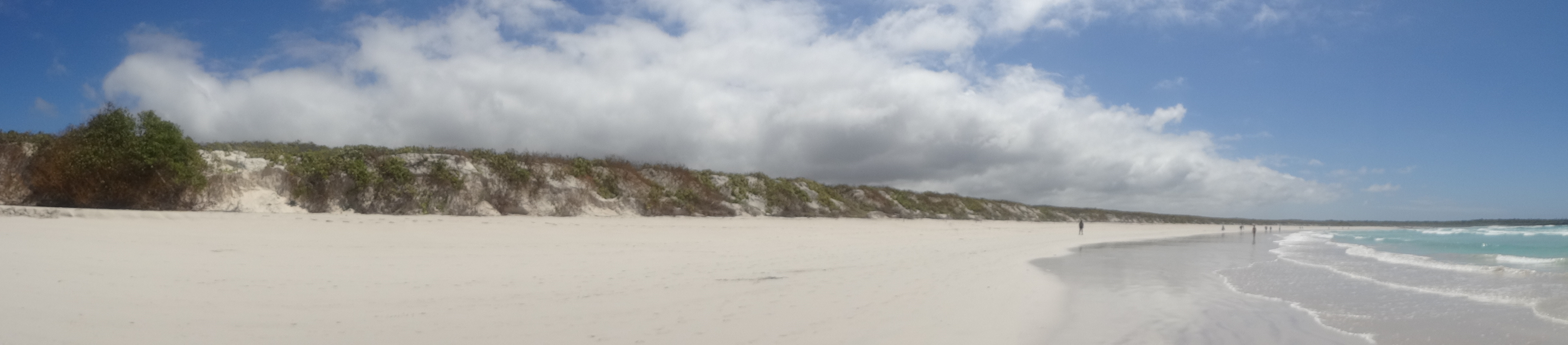
Panorama of the beach of Tortuga Bay.

== See also ==
- The Life Cairn
- Charles Darwin
