= George (snail) =

Last of the species Achatinella apexfulva

- Species: Achatinella apexfulva
- Sex: Hermaphrodite
- Born: 2004 or 2005; University of Hawaii at Manoa, Manoa
- Died: January 1, 2019 (aged 14); Kailua, Oahu
- Known for: Being the endling of his species
- Named after: Lonesome George

George (c. 2004 – January 1, 2019) (Note: Although George was about 14 years old at the time of his death in 2019, several sources state that he was born in the "early 2000s".) was a snail of the species Achatinella apexfulva, and the last known individual of his species.

== Background ==
Achatinella apexfulva was endemic to forests of Oahu, Hawaii. Its populations declined dramatically due to predation by the rosy wolfsnail, which was introduced to Hawaii in the 1950s to control agricultural pests. The species was listed as federally endangered in 1981.

== Life ==
In 1997, all known remaining specimens of A. apexfulva were collected and bred in captivity. Most offspring died of unknown causes, but one successful offspring was born. This individual, born in a laboratory at the University of Hawaii at Manoa, was named George, after Lonesome George, a Pinta Island tortoise that was also the last of its kind. George's parents were collected from the last known wild population of A. apexfulva, in a few trees near Oahu's Poamoho trail. At the time of his birth, about 20 A. apexfulva individuals survived in captivity; however, by the mid-2000s, George was the only remaining member of the species.

George has been described as "a thumbnail-size whorl of dark brown and tan." Although typically referred to using the pronoun "he", George was actually a hermaphrodite. He became sexually mature in 2012, but could not reproduce without a mate. While George was alive, it became a tradition for snail researchers to stop at the spot where the last A. apexfulva were found and scan the trees with binoculars, in the hope of finding him a mate.

As of 2016, George lived in a terrarium at the University of Hawaii. At the time of his death, George was kept in a trailer on the outskirts of Kailua, Oahu, cared for by researcher David Sischo, director of the state's snail extinction prevention program, and colleagues. In August 2018, George was among 2000 snails temporarily transferred from Kawainui Marsh to the main Department of Land and Natural Resources offices in downtown Honolulu, to protect against damage from Hurricane Lane.

== Death and legacy ==
On January 1, 2019, George died at age 14, leaving the species reportedly extinct. His body was discovered the following morning. As of 2019, George's remains are stored in a cupboard labelled "DEATH CABINET", alongside the bodies of other dead snail specimens. In 2017, researchers collected a two-millimetre sample of George's foot, which is now kept in storage at San Diego's Frozen Zoo, to be available for possible future cloning attempts.

== See also ==
- Endling
- Booming Ben, the last known heath hen
- Incas (parakeet), last known Carolina parakeet
- Lonesome George, the last known male Pinta Island tortoise
- Sudan (rhinoceros), the last known male Northern White rhinoceros
- Martha (passenger pigeon), the last known passenger pigeon
- Toughie (frog), the last known Rabbs' fringe-limbed treefrog
