= Incas (parakeet) =

Last known Carolina parakeet

- Species: Carolina parakeet (Conuropsis carolinensis)
- Sex: Male
- Hatched: Uncertain; before 1885 possibly in Florida, U.S. in captivity
- Died: February 21, 1918 (aged at least 33); Cincinnati, Ohio, U.S.
- Known for: Last known living Carolina parakeet

Incas (before 1885 – February 21, 1918) was a male Carolina parakeet and the last member of his species known with certainty. Though the American Ornithologists Union accepted a sighting in 1920 and probable sightings of wild Carolina parakeets continued into the 1930s, no specimens were collected after 1904 and Incas is often cited as the last individual in existence. Incas died in the Cincinnati Zoo in 1918, in the same enclosure as Martha, the last passenger pigeon, who died in 1914. He died within one year of his mate, Lady Jane.

== Background ==
The Carolina parakeet was the only parrot species historically native to eastern North America and was documented to be plentiful in early accounts. Over the centuries following European colonization of the Americas, a combination of factors including collection for hat feathers, the pet trade, and eradication by farmers due to their reputation as crop predators led the Carolina parakeet to become increasingly rare by the mid-19th century. As numbers declined, conservationists and bird interest groups became increasingly concerned about the species' trajectory. By 1900, multiple breeding programs had been established for the Carolina parakeet with limited success, but there was allegedly no coordination between zoos with captive birds. As the number of individual wild birds dwindled, the only certain locations of the Carolina parakeet were in captivity.

== Life ==
Incas was brought to the Cincinnati Zoo in 1885 in an attempt to establish a captive breeding population there. He was purchased along with 15 other birds for a sum of $40 (equivalent to $1,200 in 2022). Around that time, captive birds were often sold to Europe and the majority of Carolina parakeets in the pet trade were sourced in Florida with dozens at a time captured into the 1890s. At the zoo, Incas was housed in an aviary in the style of a Japanese pagoda that was built in 1875.

Incas was eventually paired with a female bird named Lady Jane who arrived in the same cohort. They were successful in laying eggs regularly over 32 years together, but they consistently rolled the eggs from their nest. While the couple was still together, the London Zoo offered $400 (over $10,000 in 2022) for the pair. Given established knowledge about Carolina parakeet breeding habits, it is most likely that the birds produced two or three eggs per clutch once each year. Lady Jane, the penultimate captive bird reportedly died aged at least 32 in late summer 1917. Zookeepers in Cincinnati alleged that afterwards Incas became "listless and mournful". At some point after September 1914, possibly after Lady Jane's death, Incas was allegedly moved into the same pagoda enclosure that Martha died in. In the 48 hours before Incas's death on the evening of February 21, 1918, Cincinnati experienced unseasonably cold weather with snowfall and night-time temperatures down to 7 °F (−14 °C).

== Legacy ==
After dying, like Martha, Incas was supposed to be sent in a block of ice to the Smithsonian Museum of Natural History. For unclear reasons, his skin never arrived there. Though it is likely that he was preserved (as his skin would have had considerable value to a museum), it appears associated records were never kept and the current location of his body is unknown. Some have speculated that his remains are unlabeled at the Cincinnati Museum of Natural History. Others have considered that in the closing year of World War I, the loss of the last captive Carolina parakeet was simply too demoralizing to pay close attention to. Incas' status as the last member of his species is often repeated without scrutiny of the highly probable persistence of wild populations into the 1930s. His death date is also periodically mis-cited as that of the last passenger pigeon.

== See also ==
- List of individual birds
- Endling
- Booming Ben, the last known heath hen
- George (snail), the last known Achatinella apexfulva
- Lonesome George, the last known male Pinta Island tortoise
- Sudan (rhinoceros), the last known male northern white rhinoceros
- Martha (passenger pigeon), the last known passenger pigeon
- Toughie (frog), the last known Rabbs' fringe-limbed tree frog
