= Lonesome George =

Last known Pinta Island tortoise

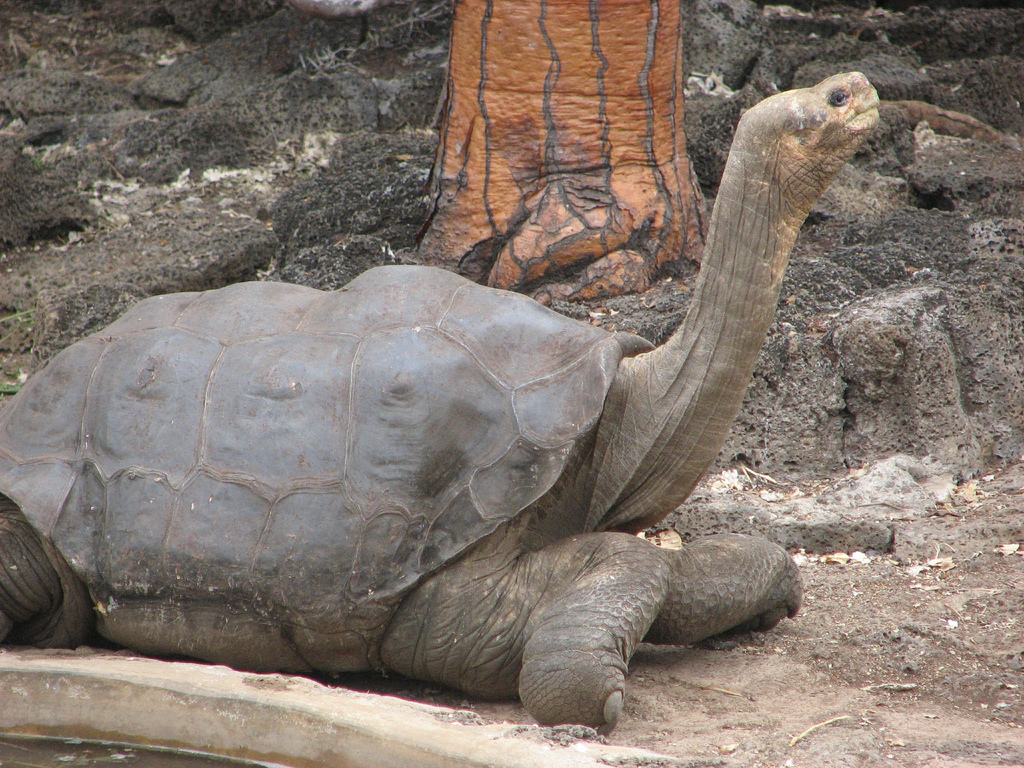
- George at Galápagos National Park headquarters in 2006
- Species: Chelonoidis niger abingdonii (Pinta Island tortoise)
- Sex: Male
- Hatched: c. 1910
- Died: June 24, 2012 (aged 101–102); Galápagos National Park
- Resting place: Taxidermied and on display at Galápagos National Park
- Nationality: Ecuador (Galápagos)
- Known for: Being an endling
- Offspring: None
- Weight: 165 lb (75 kg)
- Named after: Possibly George Gobel or Saint George

Lonesome George (Spanish: Solitario George or Jorge, c. 1910 – June 24, 2012) was a male Pinta Island tortoise (Chelonoidis niger abingdonii) and the last known individual of the subspecies. In his last years, he was known as the rarest creature in the world. George serves as an important symbol for conservation efforts in the Galápagos Islands and throughout the world.

== Discovery ==
George was first seen on the island of Pinta on November 1, 1971, by Hungarian malacologist József Vágvölgyi. The island's vegetation had been devastated by introduced feral goats, and the indigenous C. n. abingdonii population had been reduced to a single individual. It is thought that he was named after a character played by American actor George Gobel. He was relocated for his own safety to the Charles Darwin Research Station on Santa Cruz Island, where he spent his life under the care of Fausto Llerena, for whom the tortoise breeding center is named.

It was hoped that more Pinta Island tortoises would be found, either on Pinta Island or in one of the world's zoos, similar to the discovery of the Española Island male in San Diego. No other Pinta Island tortoises were found. The Pinta Island tortoise was pronounced functionally extinct, as George was in captivity.

== Mating attempts ==
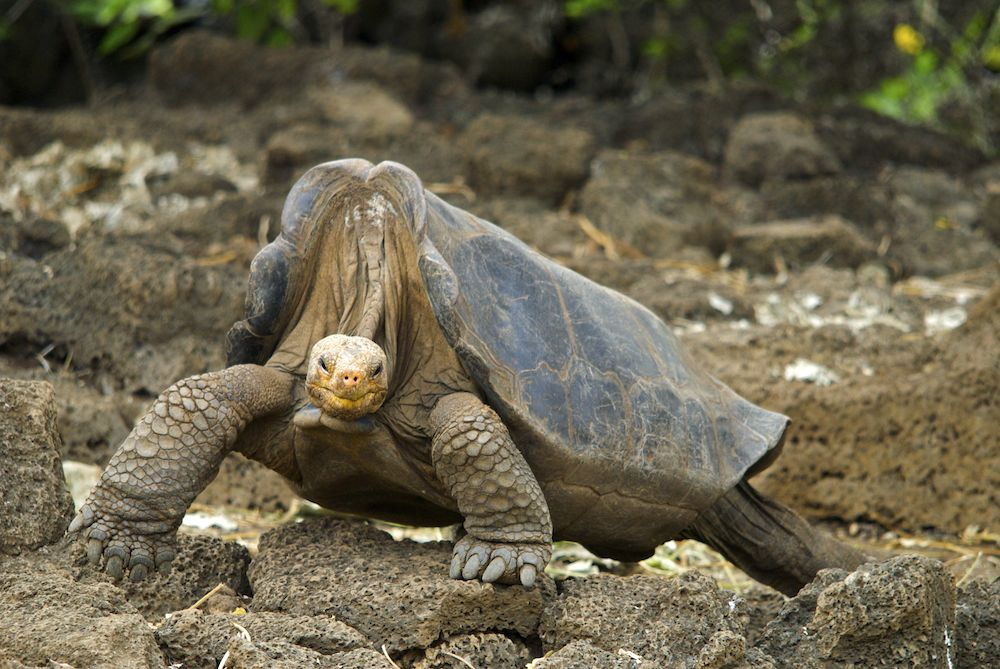
Lonesome George walking. October 2008

Over the decades, all attempts at mating Lonesome George had been unsuccessful. This prompted researchers at the Darwin Station to offer a $10,000 reward for a suitable mate.

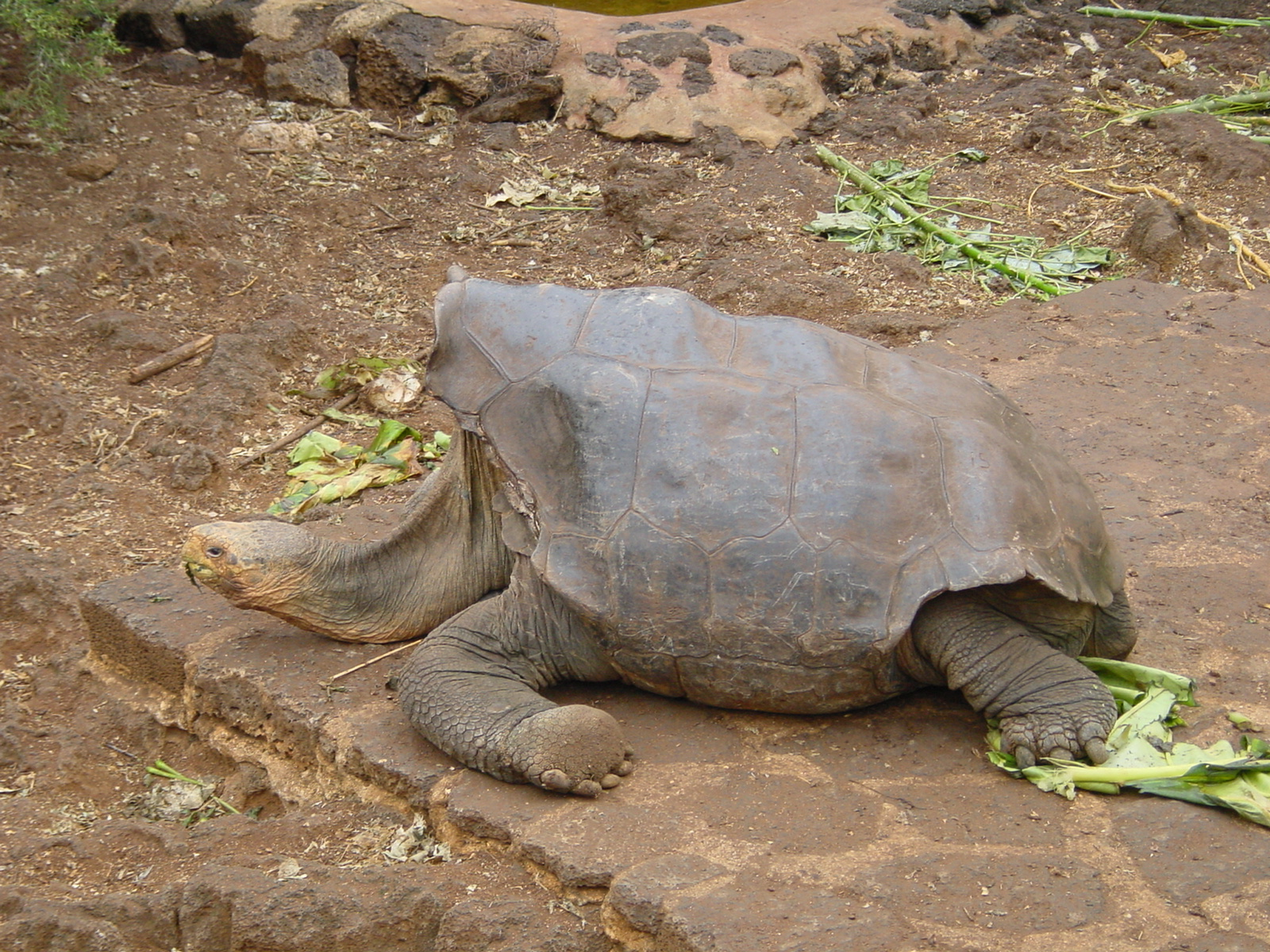
Lonesome George in December 2006

Until January 2011, George was penned with two females of the species Chelonoidis niger becki (from the Wolf Volcano region of Isabela Island), in the hope his genotype would be retained in any resulting progeny. This species was then thought to be genetically closest to George's; however, any potential offspring would have been hybrids, not purebreds of the Pinta Island species.

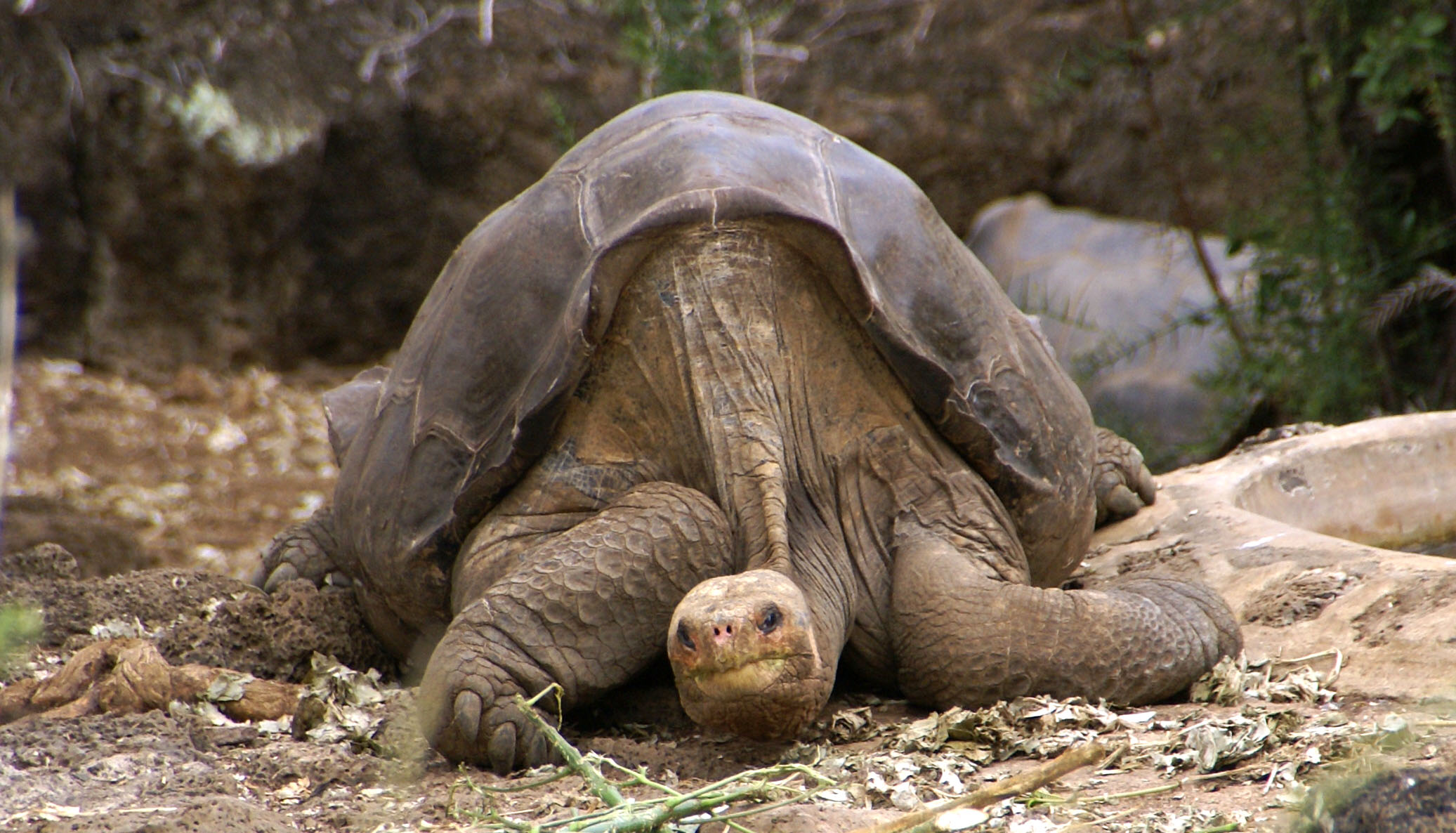
Lonesome George, the last surviving Pinta island tortoise

In July 2008, George mated with one of his female companions. 13 eggs were collected and placed in incubators. On November 11, 2008, the Charles Darwin Foundation reported 80% of the eggs showed weight loss characteristic of being inviable. By December 2008, the remaining eggs had failed to hatch and X-rays showed that they were inviable.

On July 23, 2009, exactly one year after announcing George had mated, the Galápagos National Park announced one of George's female companions had laid a second clutch of five eggs. The park authority expressed its hope for the second clutch of eggs, which it said were in perfect condition. The eggs were moved to an incubator, but on December 16, it was announced that the incubation period had ended and the eggs were inviable (as was a third batch of six eggs laid by the other female).

In November 1999, scientists reported Lonesome George was "very closely related to tortoises" from Española Island (C. n. hoodensis) and San Cristóbal Island (C. n. chathamensis). On January 20, 2011, two individual C. n. hoodensis female partners were imported to the Charles Darwin Research Station, where George lived.

== Death ==
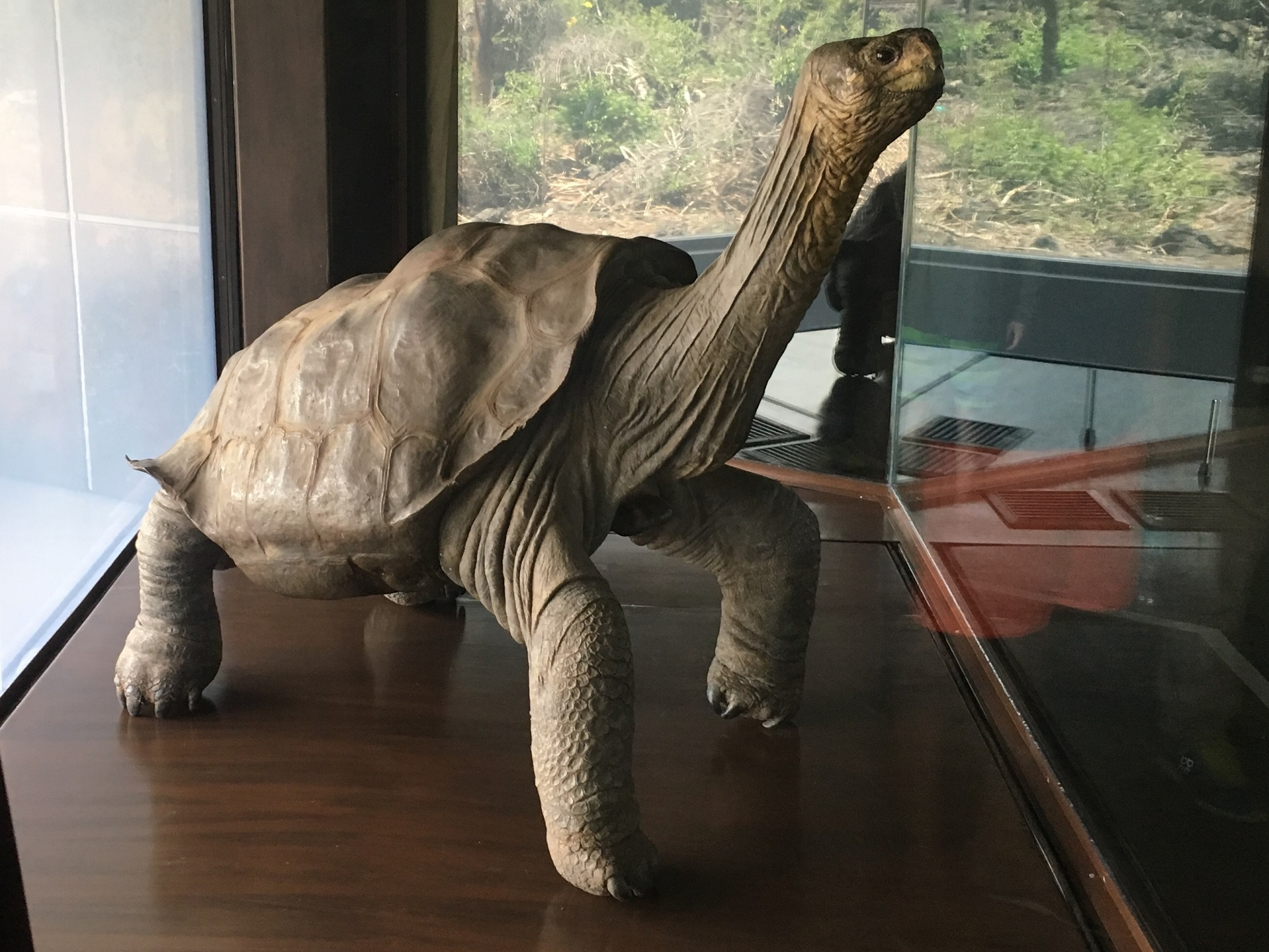
Taxidermied Lonesome George on display at the Charles Darwin Research Station

On June 24, 2012, at 8:00 A.M. local time, Galápagos National Park director Edwin Naula announced that Lonesome George had been found dead by Fausto Llerena, who had looked after him for forty years. Naula suspected that the cause of death was cardiac arrest. A necropsy confirmed that George died from natural causes. The body of Lonesome George was frozen and shipped to the American Museum of Natural History in New York City to be preserved by taxidermists. The preservation work was carried out by the museum's taxidermist George Dante, with input from scientists.

After a short display at the museum, it was expected that Lonesome George's taxidermy would be returned to the Galápagos and displayed at the Galapagos National Park headquarters on Santa Cruz Island for future generations to see. However, a dispute broke out between an Ecuadorean ministry and the Galápagos Islands. The Ecuadorean government wanted the taxidermy to be shown in the capital, Quito, but the Galápagos local mayor said Lonesome George was a symbol of the islands and should return home.

On February 17, 2017, Lonesome George's taxidermy was flown back to the Galápagos Islands, where it is on display in the Fausto Llerena Breeding Center.

== Biological conservation ==
VOA report from 2008 about George's lack of offspring

In November 2012, in the journal Biological Conservation, researchers reported identifying 17 tortoises that are partially descended from the same species as Lonesome George, leading them to speculate that closely related purebred individuals of that species may still be alive.

In December 2015, it was reported that the discovery of another subspecies, Chelonoidis niger donfaustoi, by Yale researchers had a 90% D.N.A. match to that of the Pinta Island tortoise and that scientists believe this could possibly be used to resurrect the species. This could mean that he is not the last of his kind.

In December 2018, a paper was published by Quesada et al. describing the sequencing of George's genome and some of his aging-related genes. They estimated that the population of C. n. abingdonii had been declining for the past one million years and identified lineage-specific variants affecting DNA repair genes, proteostasis, metabolism regulation and immune response as key processes during the evolution of giant tortoises via effects on longevity and resistance to infection.

In February 2020, the Galápagos National Park, along with the Galápagos Conservancy, reported that a female tortoise was directly related to the species that Lonesome George was a part of. This female was among thirty tortoises that were found to be related to two species that are considered extinct.

== See also ==
- Booming Ben, the last known heath hen
- George, the last known Achatinella apexfulva
- Incas, last known Carolina parakeet
- Jonathan, oldest known living land animal
- The Life Cairn
- Sudan, the last known male Northern White rhinoceros
- Martha, the last known passenger pigeon
- Mr Turpen, Galapagos tortoise
- Timothy, deceased Mediterranean spur-thighed tortoise
- Toughie, the last known Rabbs' fringe-limbed treefrog
