= Tuff (name) =

Tuff is both a given name and a surname. Notable people with the name include:

- Tuff Harris (born 1983), American football player
- Tuff Hedeman (born 1963), American rodeo performer
- Charles Tuff (1855–1929), British businessman and politician
- Frank Tuff (1889–1915), English cricketer
- Stein Henrik Tuff (born 1974), Norwegian ski jumper

== See also ==
- Tuf Borland (born 1998), American football player
