= Transformer utilization factor =

The transformer utilization factor (TUF) of a rectifier circuit is defined as the ratio of the DC power available at the load resistor to the AC rating of the secondary coil of a transformer.

$T.U.F = \frac{P_{odc}}{VA\ rating\ of\ transformer}$

The $VA$ rating of the transformer can be defined as: $VA = V_{r.m.s} \dot I_{r.m.s} (For\ secondary\ coil.)$TRANSFORMER utilization factor for half wave rectifier is .287 or .3.
