= Eric Freedman (journalist) =

American journalist

Eric Freedman is an American journalist and Knight Center for Environmental Journalism Chair and Professor at Michigan State University. He is a winner of the Pulitzer Prize for Beat Reporting. In 2024, he was inducted into the Michigan Journalism Hall of Fame.
