= Martha (passenger pigeon) =

Last known passenger pigeon

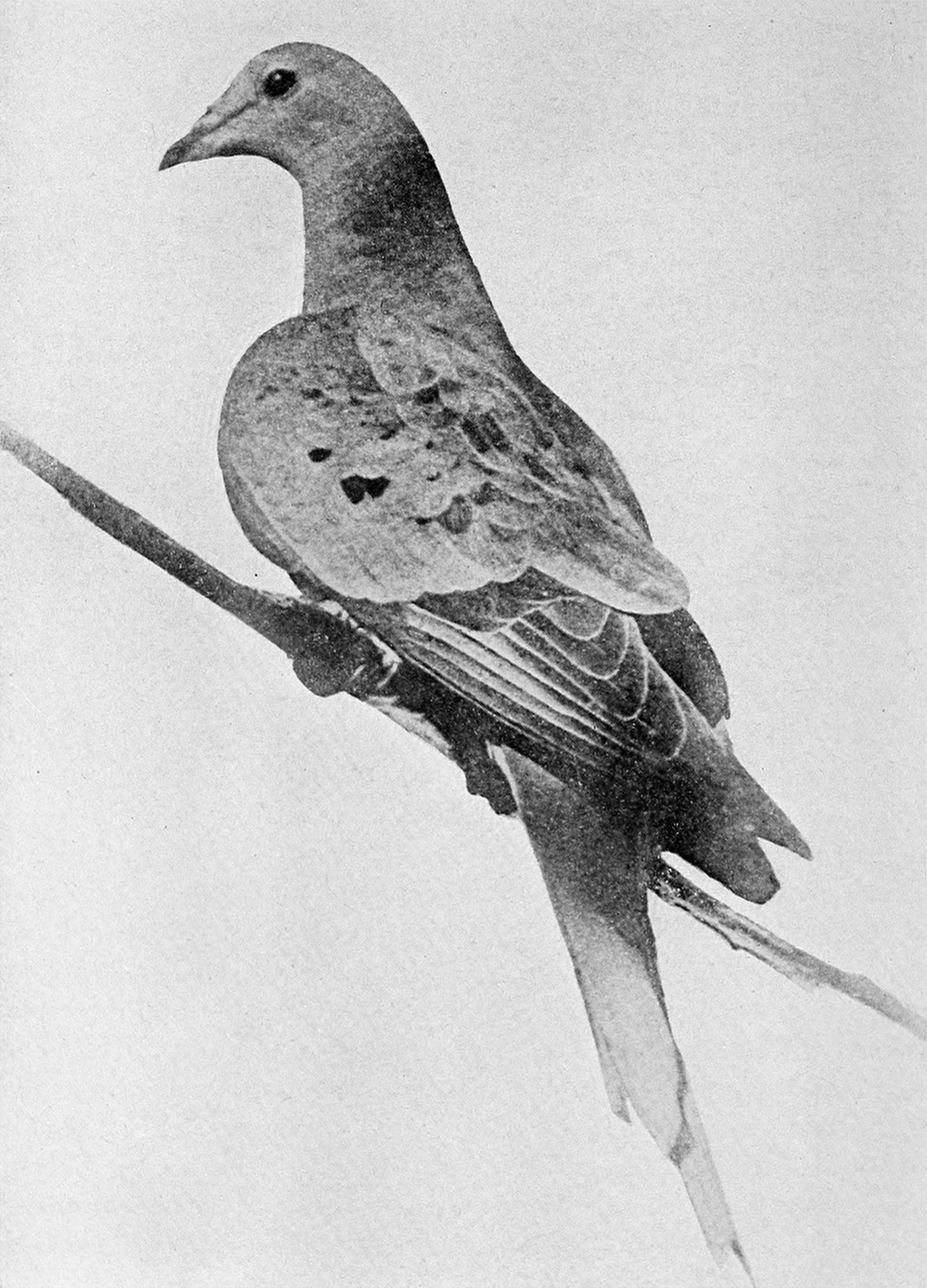
- Martha in her enclosure, 1912
- Species: Passenger pigeon
- Sex: Female
- Hatched: c. 1885
- Died: September 1, 1914 (aged 28–29); Cincinnati Zoo
- Resting place: National Museum of Natural History
- Known for: Last known living passenger pigeon
- Named after: Martha Washington

Martha (c. 1885 – September 1, 1914) was a passenger pigeon, the last known of her species; she was named "Martha" in honor of Martha Washington, the first lady of the United States from 1789 to 1797.

== Early life ==
Martha's body on display at the Smithsonian in 1956.

The history of the Cincinnati Zoo's passenger pigeons has been described by Arlie William Schorger in his monograph on the species as "hopelessly confused," and he also said that it is "difficult to find a more garbled history" than that of Martha. The generally accepted version is that, by the turn of the 20th century, the last known group of passenger pigeons was kept by Professor Charles Otis Whitman at the University of Chicago. Whitman originally acquired his passenger pigeons from David Whittaker of Wisconsin, who sent him six birds, two of which later bred and hatched Martha in about 1885. Martha was named in honor of Martha Washington. Whitman kept these pigeons to study their behavior, along with rock doves and Eurasian collared-doves. Whitman and the Cincinnati Zoo, recognizing the decline of the wild populations, attempted to consistently breed the surviving birds, including attempts at making a rock dove foster passenger pigeon eggs. These attempts were unsuccessful, and Whitman sent Martha to the Cincinnati Zoo in 1902.

However, other sources argue that Martha was instead the descendant of three pairs of passenger pigeons purchased by the Cincinnati Zoo in 1877. Another source claimed that when the Cincinnati Zoo opened in 1875, it already had 22 birds in its collection. These sources claim that Martha was hatched at the Cincinnati Zoo in 1885, and that the passenger pigeons were originally kept not because of the rarity of the species, but to enable guests to have a closer look at a native species.

== Cincinnati Zoo ==
Martha in her enclosure

By November 1907, Martha and her two male companions at the Cincinnati Zoo were the only known surviving passenger pigeons after four captive males in Milwaukee died during the winter. One of the Cincinnati males died in April 1909, followed by the remaining male on July 10, 1910. Martha soon became a celebrity due to her status as an endling, and offers of a $1,000 reward for finding a mate for Martha brought even more visitors to see her. Several years before her death Martha suffered an apoplectic stroke, leaving her weakened; the zoo built a lower roost for her as she could no longer reach her old one. Martha died at 1 p.m. on September 1, 1914, of old age. Her body was found lifeless on her cage's floor. Depending on the source, Martha was between 17–29 years old at the time of her death, although 29 is the generally accepted figure. Her death marked the extinction of the species.

== After death ==
Martha's stuffed body in 2022

After her death, Martha was quickly brought to the Cincinnati Ice Company, where she was held by her feet and frozen into a 300-pound (140 kg) block of ice. She was then sent by express train to the Smithsonian, where she arrived on September 4, 1914, and was photographed. She had been molting when she died, and as such she was missing several feathers, including some of her longer tail feathers. William Palmer skinned Martha while Nelson R. Wood mounted her skin. Her internal parts were dissected by Robert Wilson Shufeldt and are also preserved and kept by the National Museum of Natural History.

From the 1920s through the early 1950s, she was displayed in the National Museum of Natural History's Bird Hall, placed on a small branch fastened to a block of Styrofoam and paired with a male passenger pigeon that had been shot in Minnesota in 1873. She was then displayed as part of the Birds of the World exhibit that ran from 1956 to 1999. During this time, she left the Smithsonian twice: in 1966 to be displayed at the Zoological Society of San Diego's Golden Jubilee Conservation Conference and in June 1974 to the Cincinnati Zoo for the dedication of the Passenger Pigeon Memorial. When the Smithsonian shut down its Birds of the World exhibit, Martha was removed from display and kept in a special exhibit at the Cincinnati Zoo. Martha was back on display in the Smithsonian from June 2014 to September 2015 for the exhibit Once There Were Billions. Martha was also on public display in the Smithsonian's "Objects of Wonder" exhibit alongside a mountain gorilla skull from March 10, 2017, to September 8, 2024.

== Cultural significance ==
The last passenger pigeon

Martha has become a symbol of the threat of extinction. She was used at the Zoological Society of San Diego's 1966 Golden Jubilee Conservation Conference as a mascot to emphasize the need for conservation. A Harvard historian has described Martha's remains as "an organic monument, biologically continuous with the living bird she commemorates, the embodiment of extinction itself." Many authors writing about extinction have made what one described as a "strange pilgrimage" to see her remains.

John Herald, a bluegrass singer, wrote a song dedicated to Martha and the extinction of the passenger pigeon that he titled "Martha (Last of the Passenger Pigeons)". Hugh Prestwood wrote a song called "Martha" which details her trying to find a mate.

== See also ==
- List of individual birds
- Booming Ben, the last known heath hen
- George (snail), the last known Achatinella apexfulva
- Incas (parakeet), last known Carolina parakeet, who also died at the Cincinnati Zoo
- Lonesome George, the last known male Pinta Island tortoise
- Sudan (rhinoceros), the last male northern white rhinoceros, whose death marked the functional extinction of his subspecies
- Toughie (frog), the last known Rabbs' fringe-limbed treefrog
