= Tough =

Tough may refer to:

- Toughness, the resistance to fracture of a material when stressed
- Machismo, prominently exhibited or excessive masculinity
- Psychological resilience,

Tough may also refer to:

== People ==
- Jim Barry (c. 1891–1967), aka Tough Barry, Irish hurling coach

== Music ==
- Tough (John Mayall album), 2009
- Tough (Kurtis Blow album), 1982
- Tough (Wishbone Ash album), 2008
- Tough!, 1966 album by Art Blakey
- "Tough" (Craig Morgan song), 2007
- "Tough" (Kellie Pickler song), 2011
- "Tough" (Lewis Capaldi song), 2018
- "Tough" (Quavo and Lana Del Rey song), 2024
- "Tough", 1960 single by The Bill Smith Combo

== Other ==
- Tough (film)
- Kirkton of Tough, settlement in Aberdeenshire, Scotland
- Tough (manga)
- The Tough, 1957 Egyptian film
- T-ough Press, underground Russian publisher

== See also ==
- Tuff, a type of volcanic rock
- Tough movement, in formal syntax, movement of the object in construction like "the problem is tough to solve"
