= Toughie (frog) =

Last known Rabbs' fringe-limbed treefrog (died 2016)

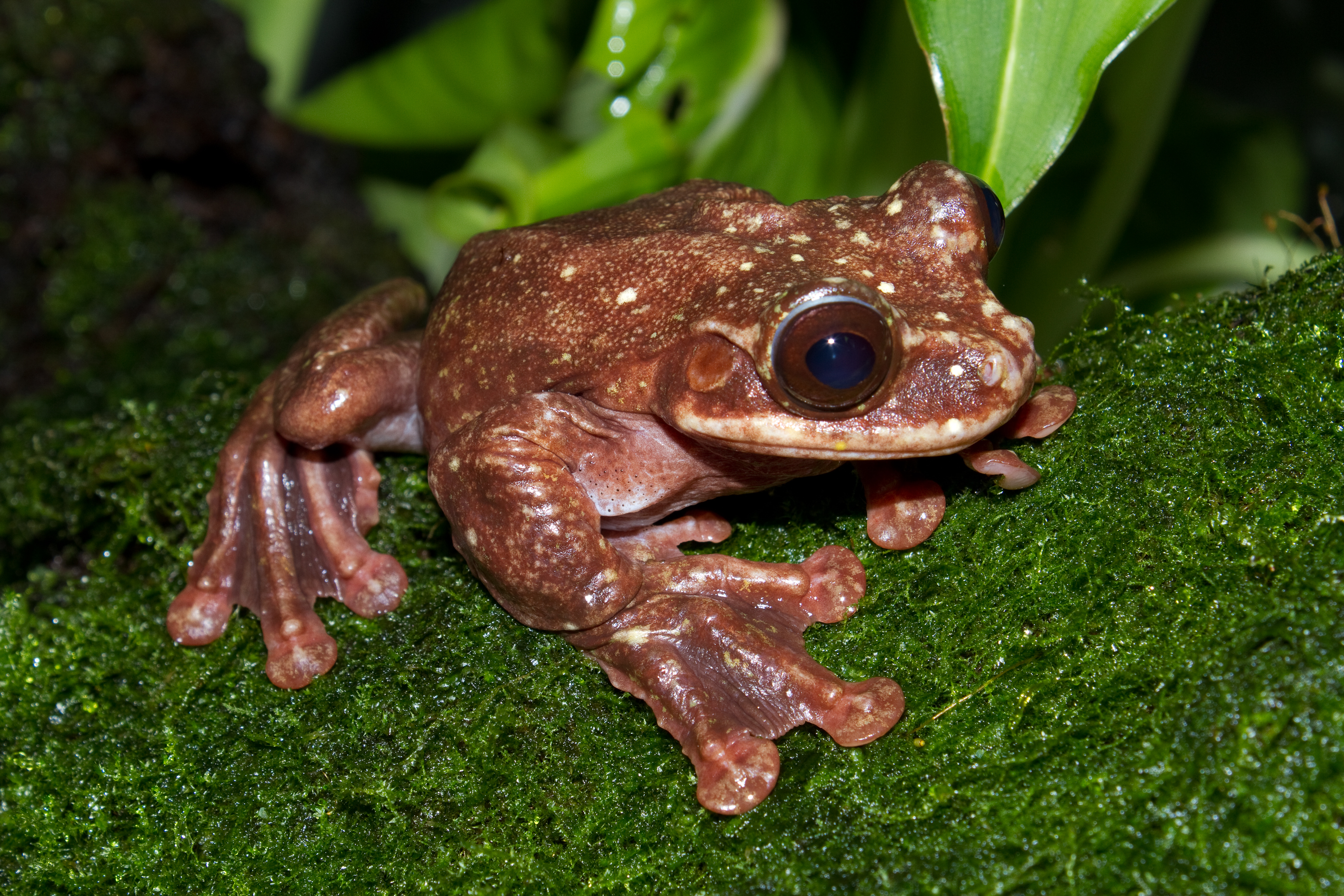
- Toughie in 2011
- Species: Rabbs' fringe-limbed treefrog
- Sex: Male
- Hatched: Uncertain; before 2005; Panama
- Died: September 26, 2016 (aged at least 12); Atlanta Botanical Garden; Atlanta, Georgia, US
- Known for: Being his species' endling
- Offspring: None

Toughie was the last known living Rabbs' fringe-limbed treefrog. The species, scientifically known as Ecnomiohyla rabborum, is thought to be extinct, as the last specimen—Toughie—died in captivity on September 26, 2016.

== Captivity ==
Toughie was captured as an adult in Panama in 2005, when researchers went on a conservation mission to rescue species from Batrachochytrium dendrobatidis, a fungus deadly to amphibians. Toughie was one of "several dozen" frogs and tadpoles of the same species to be transported back to the United States.

Toughie lived at the Atlanta Botanical Garden in Georgia. At the Garden, he was placed in a special containment area called the "frogPOD", a biosecure enclosure. Visitors to the Garden are not allowed to visit the frogPOD, as it is used to house critically endangered animals. While in captivity at the Garden, Toughie sired tadpoles with a female, but none survived. After the female died, the only other known specimen in the world was a male, leaving Toughie no other options of reproducing. The other male, who lived at the Zoo Atlanta, was euthanized on February 17, 2012, due to health concerns.

Since Toughie was brought in as an adult to the Garden, they do not know his age but estimated that he was at least 12 years old. On December 15, 2014, Toughie was recorded vocalizing again. It was his first known call since being collected as an adult in 2005.

Toughie died on September 26, 2016, at the Garden.

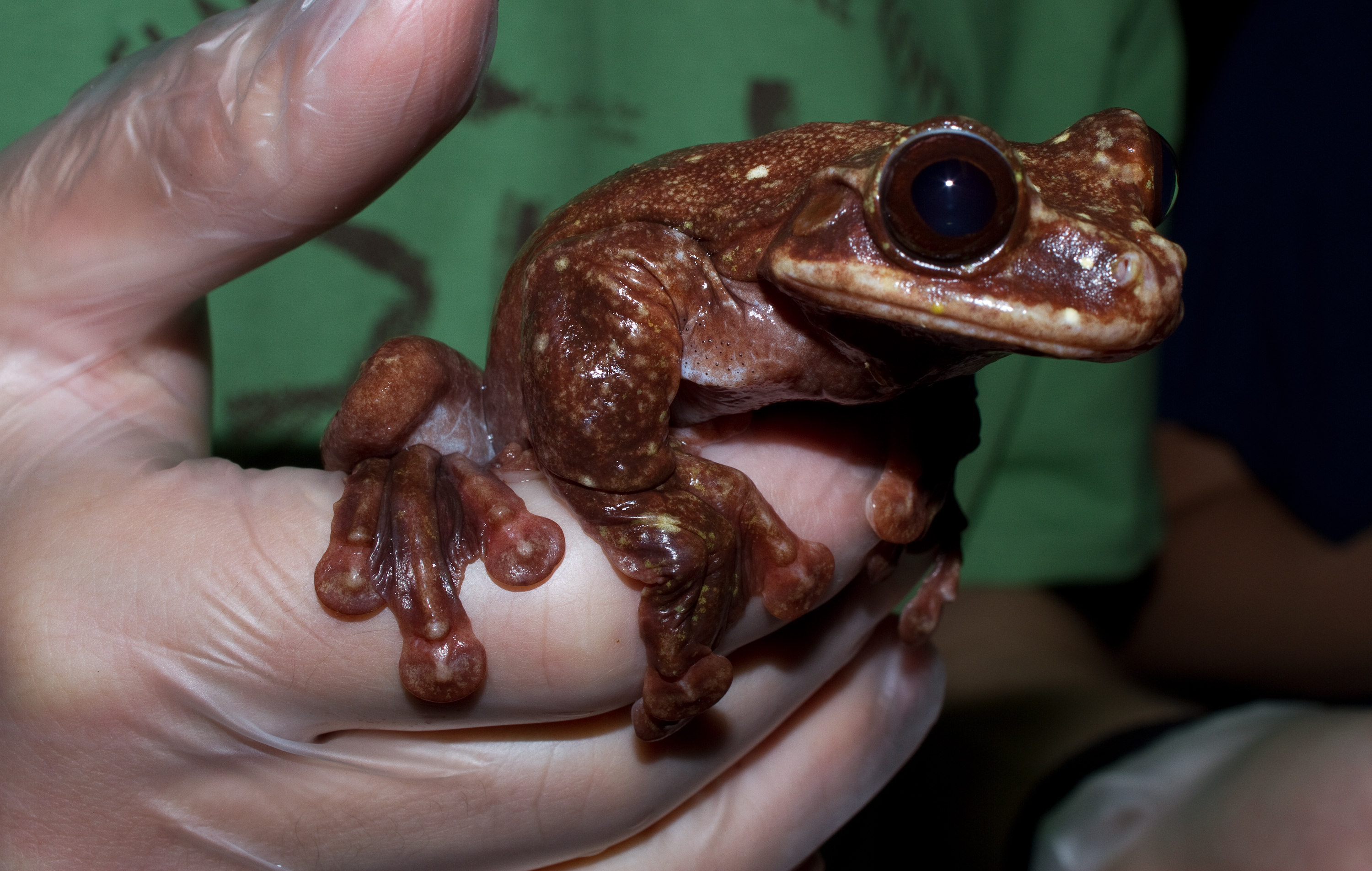
Toughie

== Personal characteristics ==
Toughie was given his name by Mark Mandica's son Anthony. Mark Mandica was Toughie's caretaker for many years at the Atlanta Botanical Garden. Toughie did not like to be handled. He would pinch a handler's hand in an attempt to "say 'let me go'", according to handler Leslie Phillips. She continued with, "For me it is incredibly motivating working with the Rabbs' frog. Having him here is a constant reminder of what can potentially happen to other species if we don't continue the conservation work that we do here at the Atlanta Botanical Garden. Honestly, it is also nerve-racking at times working with him. It can be a challenging balance between leaving him alone as much as possible to avoid undue stress, while still providing the best possible care... He is just really cool. No other frog I have seen is quite like him. He is muscular and has giant webbed feet and big eyes ... He is a very handsome frog." Handlers tried to touch him as little as possible, but they did weigh him once a week to keep track of his health.

== Featured in projects ==
In July 2013, National Geographic featured Toughie and his species in their magazine. It is part of The Photo Ark project run by photographer Joel Sartore. They also focused on the Atlanta Botanical Garden's Amphibian Conservation Program.

In 2014, Louie Psihoyos filmed Toughie for his 2015 film Racing Extinction, including footage of Sartore photographing him. To promote the film and the extinction crisis, a 30-story series of photographs was projected onto the side of the United Nations Building in New York City in September 2014. Included was a photograph of Toughie.

Toughie was the subject of the 2024 song "The endLing" by Talia Schlanger.

== See also ==
- Booming Ben, the last known heath hen
- Conservation status
- Endling
- Extinction
- George (snail), the last known Achatinella apexfulva
- Incas (parakeet), last known Carolina parakeet
- List of recently extinct amphibians
- Lists of extinct animals
- Lonesome George, the last known Pinta Island tortoise
- Sudan (rhinoceros), the last known male Northern White rhinoceros
- Martha (passenger pigeon), the last known passenger pigeon
- Rare species
