= Galápagos Province =

Province of Ecuador

Galápagos Province Provincia de Galápagos
- Province
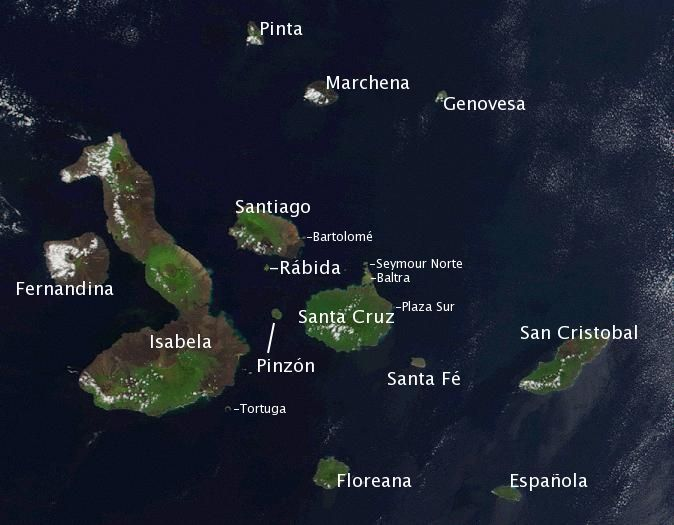
- Satellite photo of the Galápagos islands

- Flag
- Nickname: Archipelago of Galápagos
- Location of Galápagos Province

- Cantons of Galápagos Province
- Coordinates: 0°33′37″S 91°2′27″W
- Country: Ecuador
- Created: February 18, 1973
- Named for: Galápagos Islands
- Capital: Puerto Baquerizo Moreno
- Largest city: Puerto Ayora
- Cantons: List of cantons: Isabela; San Cristóbal; Santa Cruz

Government
  - Prefect: Position abolished
  - Governor: Edwin Altamirano Trujillo

Area
  - Province: 8,010 km^{2} (3,090 sq mi)
  - Land: 7,882 km^{2} (3,043 sq mi)
- Highest elevation: 1,710 m (5,610 ft)
- Lowest elevation: 0 m (0 ft)

Population (2022 census)
  - Province: 28,583
  - Density: 3.626/km^{2} (9.392/sq mi)
  - Urban: 22,741
- Time zone: UTC-6 (GALT)
- Area code: (0)5
- ISO 3166 code: EC-W
- Vehicle registration: W
- Languages: Spanish
- HDI (2017): 0.801 very high · 2nd
- Website: www.gobernaciongalapagos.gob.ec

Galápagos (Spanish pronunciation: [ɡaˈlapaɣos]) is a province of Ecuador in the country's Insular region, located approximately 1,000 km (620 mi) off the western coast of the mainland. The capital is Puerto Baquerizo Moreno.

The province administers the Galápagos Islands, a group of volcanic islands that sit on the equator, famous for their unique biodiversity popularized by naturalist Charles Darwin and his theory of evolution.

== Demographics ==
Ethnic groups as of the Ecuadorian census of 2010:

- Mestizo 74.5%
- White 9.7%
- Indigenous 7.0%
- Afro-Ecuadorian 5.2%
- Montubio 1.9%
- Other 1.7%

== History ==
It is estimated that the islands were formed 8 million years ago as a result of tectonic activity on the seabed. The archipelago was likely inhabited long ago: the Norwegian explorer Thor Heyerdahl in 1963 reported that he found Inca archaeological sites and objects. The Galapagos Islands were discovered by chance on 10 March 1535, when the Dominican friar Fray Tomas de Berlanga, Bishop of Panama, went to Peru in pursuance of an order of the Spanish monarch, Charles V, to arbitrate in a dispute between Francisco Pizarro and his subordinates after the conquest of the Inca empire. Because of a calm and strong currents, the ship of Bishop was dragged to the Galapagos. In chronicling his adventure, directed from Portoviejo Emperor Charles V on the discovery of the Galapagos Islands, Berlanga described the bleak desert conditions in the islands and the giant tortoises that inhabited them. He also described the marine iguanas, sea lions and many types of birds, emphasizing the unusual mildness of animals and expressed in the following words:

It brought the ship very good weather of breezes seven days, that the pilot was making himself near the land and gave us calm six days; the currents were so large, they engulfed us so that Wednesday March 10, we saw an island and because the ship had no more water than for two days, agreed to take the boat and go ashore for water and grass for the horses. And having left, they found nothing but sea lions, turtles and tortoises so big that one could carry a man on top, and many iguanas who are like serpents. Another day we saw another bigger island which is that of large mountains, and believing that there for its greatness as for its monstrosity it could not fail to have rivers and fruits, we went to it, because the first would go down ten or twelve leagues, and in this was drunk the water which there was in the ship and spent three days in taking the island, with calm, in which we men, like the horses suffered many labors there.

== Early explorations ==
The first maps to include the islands were prepared by Abraham Ortelius and Gerardus Mercator around 1570. The islands were described as "the Galopegos Insulae" (Turtle Island). The Galapagos were used by pirates hideout in English as trips to plunder Spanish galleons carrying gold and silver from America to Spain. The first known pirate to visit the islands was Richard Hawkins, in 1593. From then until 1816 many pirates came to the archipelago.

Alexander Selkirk, (1676 – 13 December 1721), also known as Alexander Selcraig, was a Scottish sailor who was the man whose adventures on the islands of Juan Fernández (explorer), (c. 1536 – c. 1604) was a Spanish explorer and navigator in the Pacific regions of the Viceroyalty of Peru and Captaincy General of Chile west of colonial South America who inspired Daniel Defoe to write Robinson Crusoe, visited the Galapagos in 1708 after he was rescued from the island of Juan Fernández by the privateer Woodes Rogers. Rogers was at the archipelago to repair their ships after sacking Guayaquil.

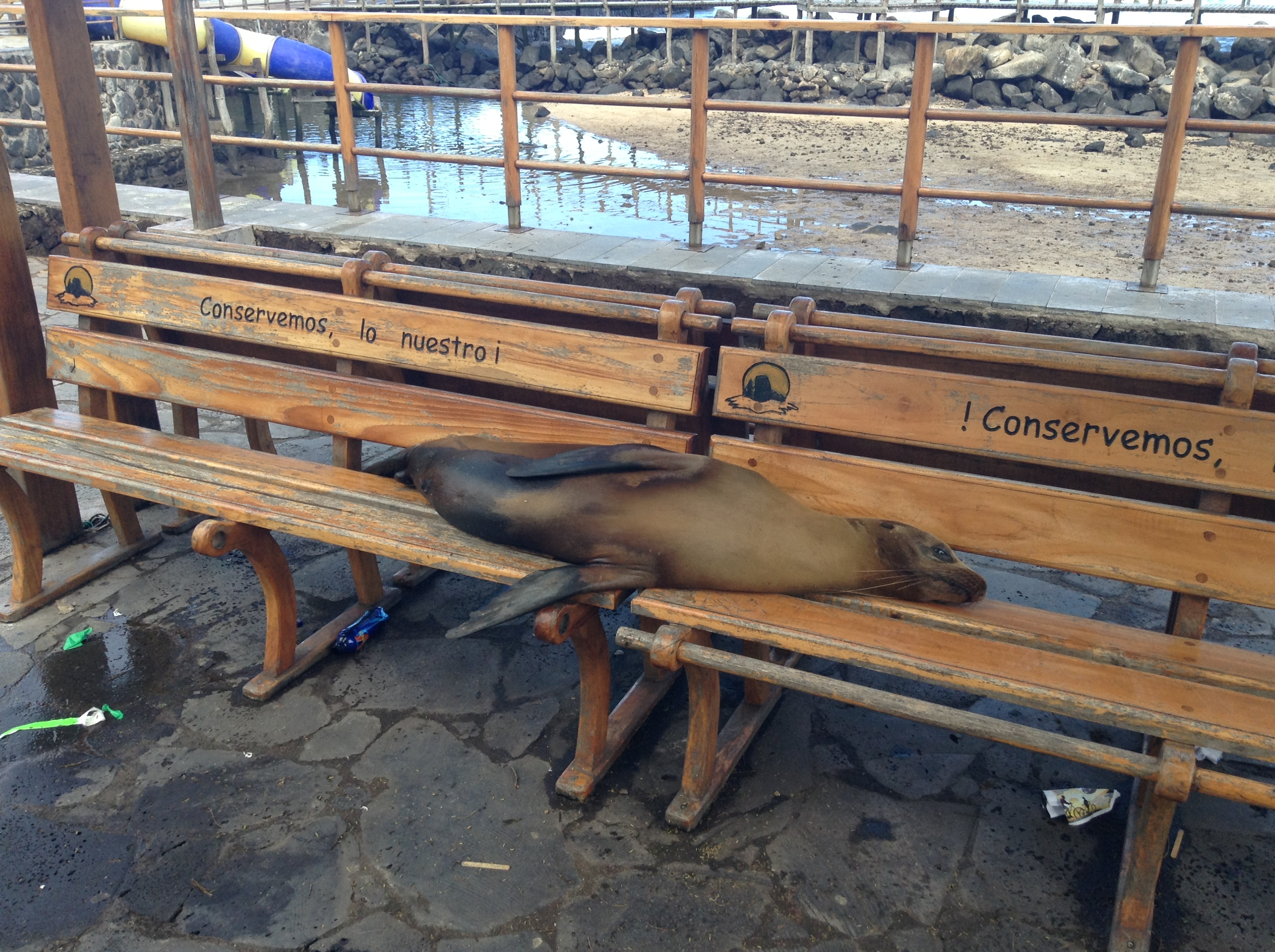
Adult Galápagos sea lion resting on a park bench in Puerto Baquerizo Moreno.

The first scientific mission that visited the Galapagos was the Malaspina expedition, a Spanish expedition led by Alejandro Malaspina, who arrived in 1790. However, the records of the expedition were never published.

In 1793, James Colnett, (1753 – 1 September 1806) was an officer of the British Royal Navy, an explorer, and a maritime fur trade described the flora and fauna of the islands and suggested they could be used as base for the whalers operating in the Pacific Ocean. Collnet also drew the first charts of the Galapagos. These whalers captured and killed thousands of tortoises in the archipelago because the tortoises could survive for months without food or drink. The gigantic Galapagos tortoises were transported inside the holds of whaling ships. A phrase "living cupboards" could be desortugas would be kept alive and killed when fresh meat was required by the whaling crews. Tortoises provided fresh protein on the long journeys typical of whaling ships. Hunting of these tortoises was the cause of the large decrease of their population, and in some cases the destruction of certain species of the Galapagos Tortoise.

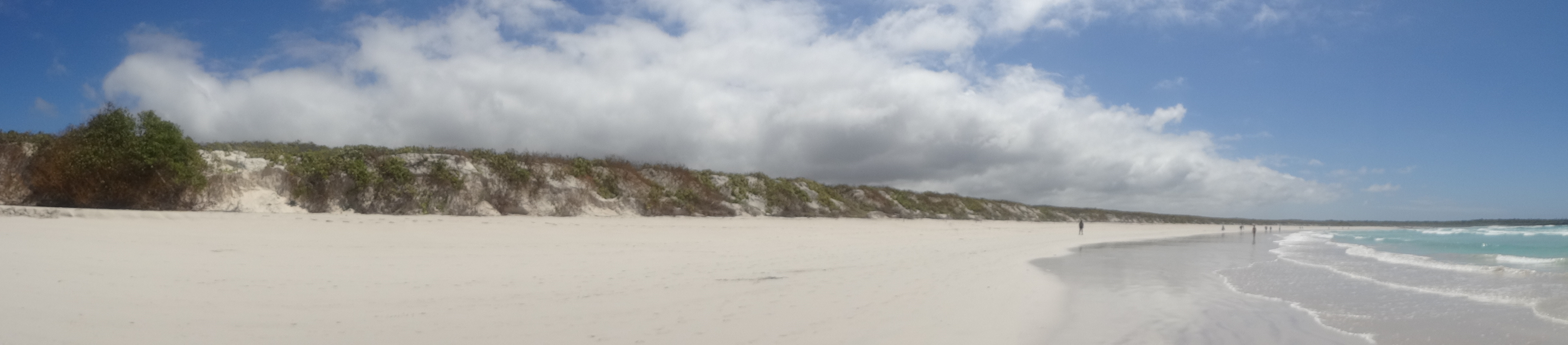
Panoramic of the beach at Tortuga Bay.

== Political divisions ==
The province is divided in three cantons, each encompassing a number of islands. They are:

Canton	Pop.	Area (km²)	Capital	Principal islands
Isabela	1,780	5,367	Puerto Villamil	Darwin, Fernandina, Isabela, Wolf
San Cristóbal	6,142	849	Puerto Baquerizo Moreno	Española, Floreana, Genovesa, San Cristóbal, Santa Fe
Santa Cruz	11,262	1,794	Puerto Ayora	Baltra, Bartolomé, Marchena, North Seymour, Pinta, Pinzón, Rábida, Santa Cruz, Santiago
Galápagos	19,184	8,010	Puerto Baquerizo Moreno	

== See also ==
- Provinces of Ecuador
- Cantons of Ecuador
- Galapagos National Park
