= Fanny Uribe =

Ecuadorian politician

Member of the National Assembly
- In office 14 May 2013 – 14 May 2017

Member of the National Congress
- In office 10 August 1998 – 5 January 2003

Personal details
- Born: 1963 (age 62–63)
- Occupation: Politician

Fanny Esther Uribe López (born 1963) is an Ecuadorian biologist and politician who was the last person to be elected prefect of the Galápagos.

== Biography ==
Uribe began her political career in 1996 as an alternate deputy of the Galápagos Province for the Popular Democracy party. In the 1998 legislative elections, she was elected national deputy of Galápagos by the same party. From the National Congress, she was one of the promoters of the Special Law of Conservation and Sustainable Development for the province of Galápagos.

In the 2004 local elections, Uribe was elected provincial prefect of Galápagos with 54% of the votes by the alliance between the Popular Democracy, the 21 January Patriotic Society Party and the Socialist Party-Broad Front, becoming the first woman to hold that position. The entry into force of the 2008 constitution eliminated the Galápagos provincial council, thus also making her the last person to be elected to the province's prefecture. She resigned from her position to participate in the 2009 local elections as a candidate for mayor of Santa Cruz for the Municipalist Movement, but she was not elected.

In the 2013 legislative elections, Uribe was elected to the National Assembly representing Avanza in the Galápagos constituency.
