= Baltra (surname) =

Baltra is a Chilean surname.

== People with the name ==
- Alberto Baltra (1912–1981), Chilean politician and economist
- Mireya Baltra (1932–2022), Chilean sociologist, journalist, and politician
- Ruth Baltra Moreno (1938–2014), Chilean actress, dramatist, teacher, and theater director

== See also ==
- Baltra Island, Galápagos Islands, Ecuador
