= Itabaca Channel =

The Itabaca Channel separates the islands of Baltra and Santa Cruz in the Galápagos archipelago in Ecuador. The Itabaca Channel is crossed by water taxis which ferry passengers from Baltra (South Seymour), in the North, where there is an airport (Seymour Airport), to Santa Cruz in the South, and vice versa. The channel also provides an anchorage for small tour vessels, and an unloading point for cargo ships bringing goods from the mainland of Ecuador to Santa Cruz; these goods are then transported by trucks overland to the town of Puerto Ayora. The channel is around 350 meters at its narrowest point.

== Name ==
Canal Itabaca, originally Ilabaca, was most likely named after the Chilean naval officer Julio Ernesto Ilabaca León (b. 1891), who was on board the Chilean naval corvette General Baquedano when it came to Galapagos in 1910 to conduct a hydrographical survey of the islands. Baltra Island on the northern side of the channel was named during the same voyage.

== Wildlife ==
Wildlife commonly seen in the Itabaca channel include blue-footed boobies, lava herons, lava gulls, brown pelicans and the occasional tiger shark.

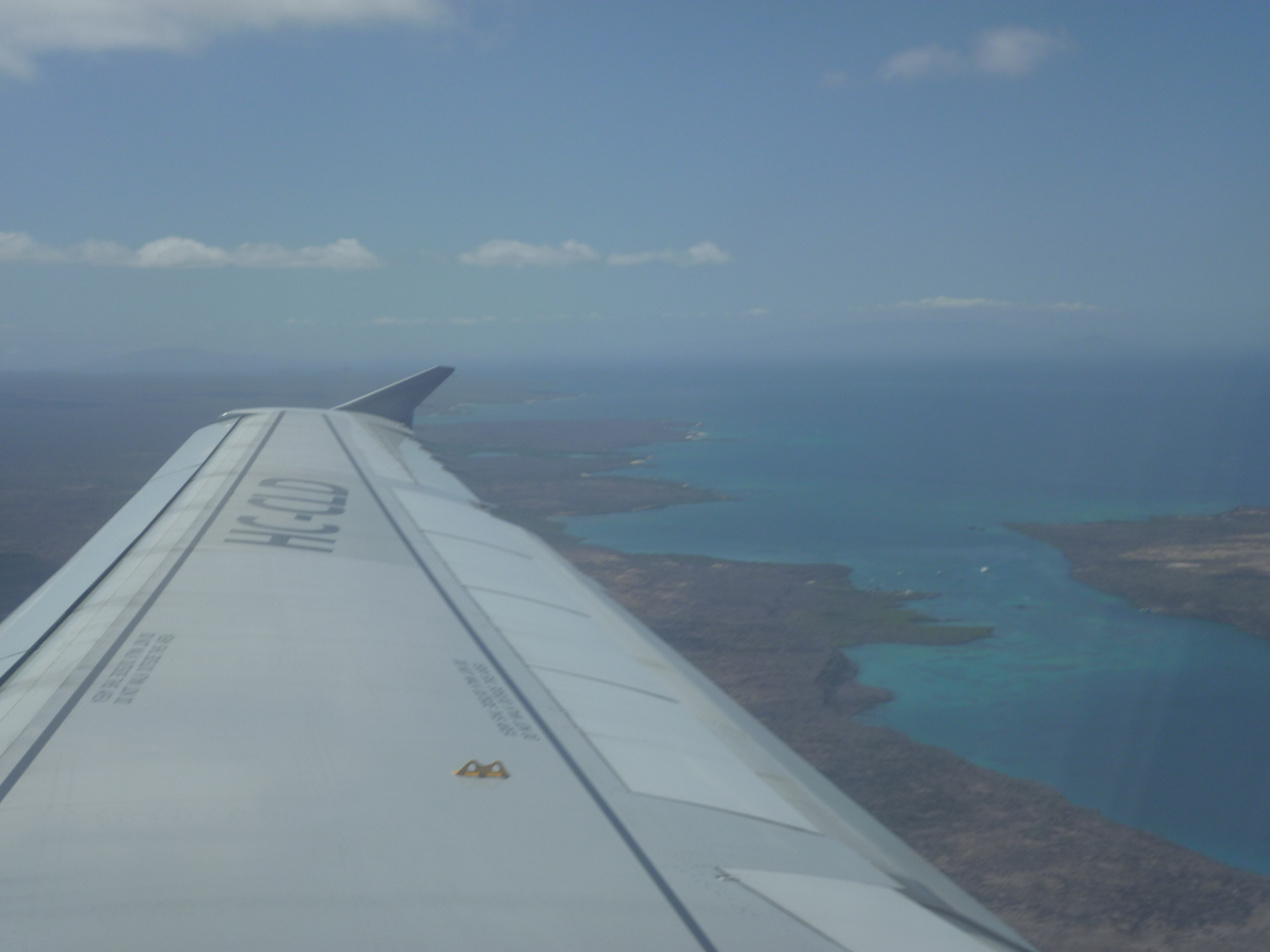
located on the right and to the left is the Island of Baltra, in the middle is the Itabaca Channel and Baltra is on the left

== Additional images ==
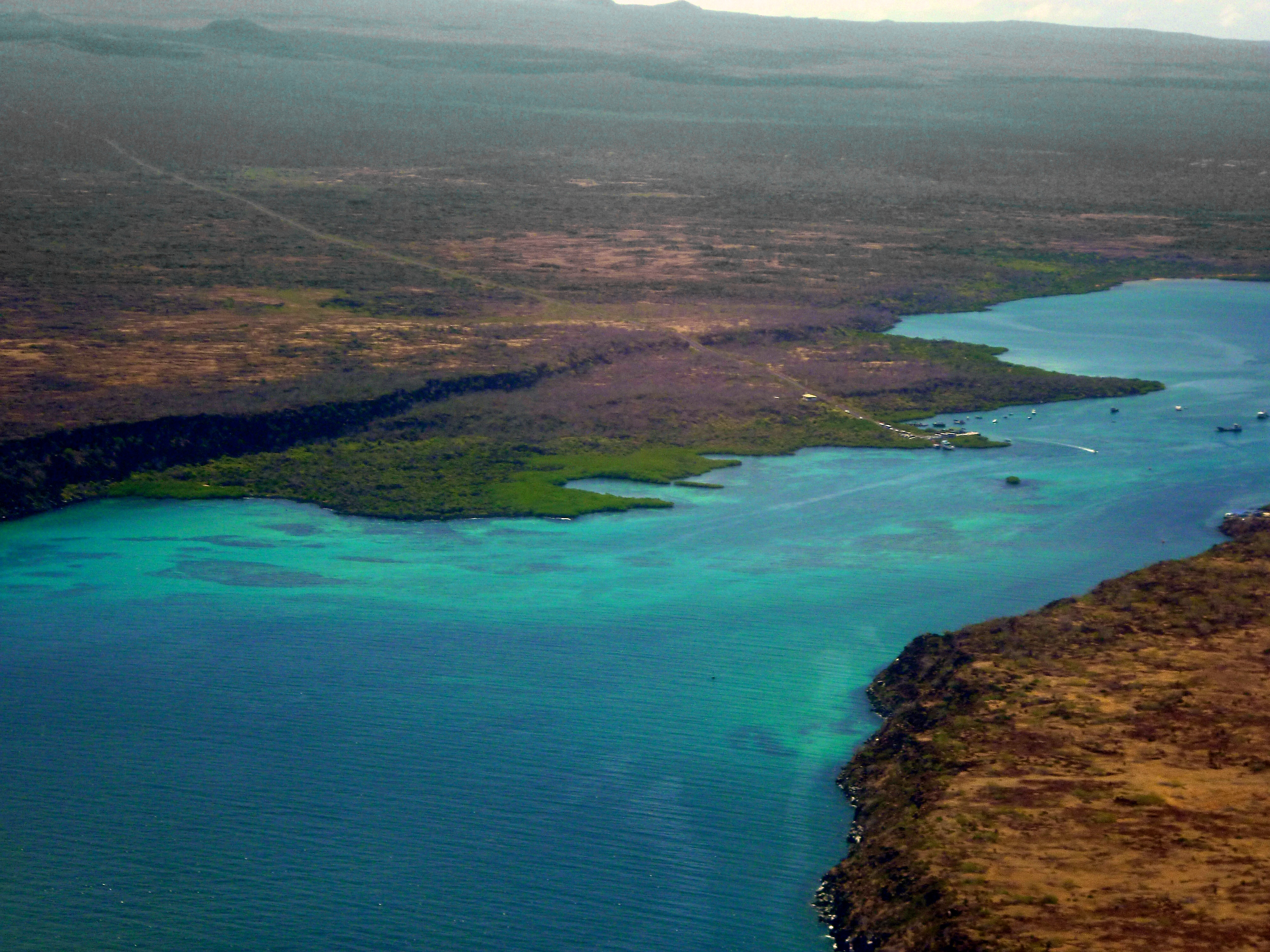
Flying out of Baltra, on the right with the Island of Santa Cruz on the left and in the middle is the Itabaca Channel

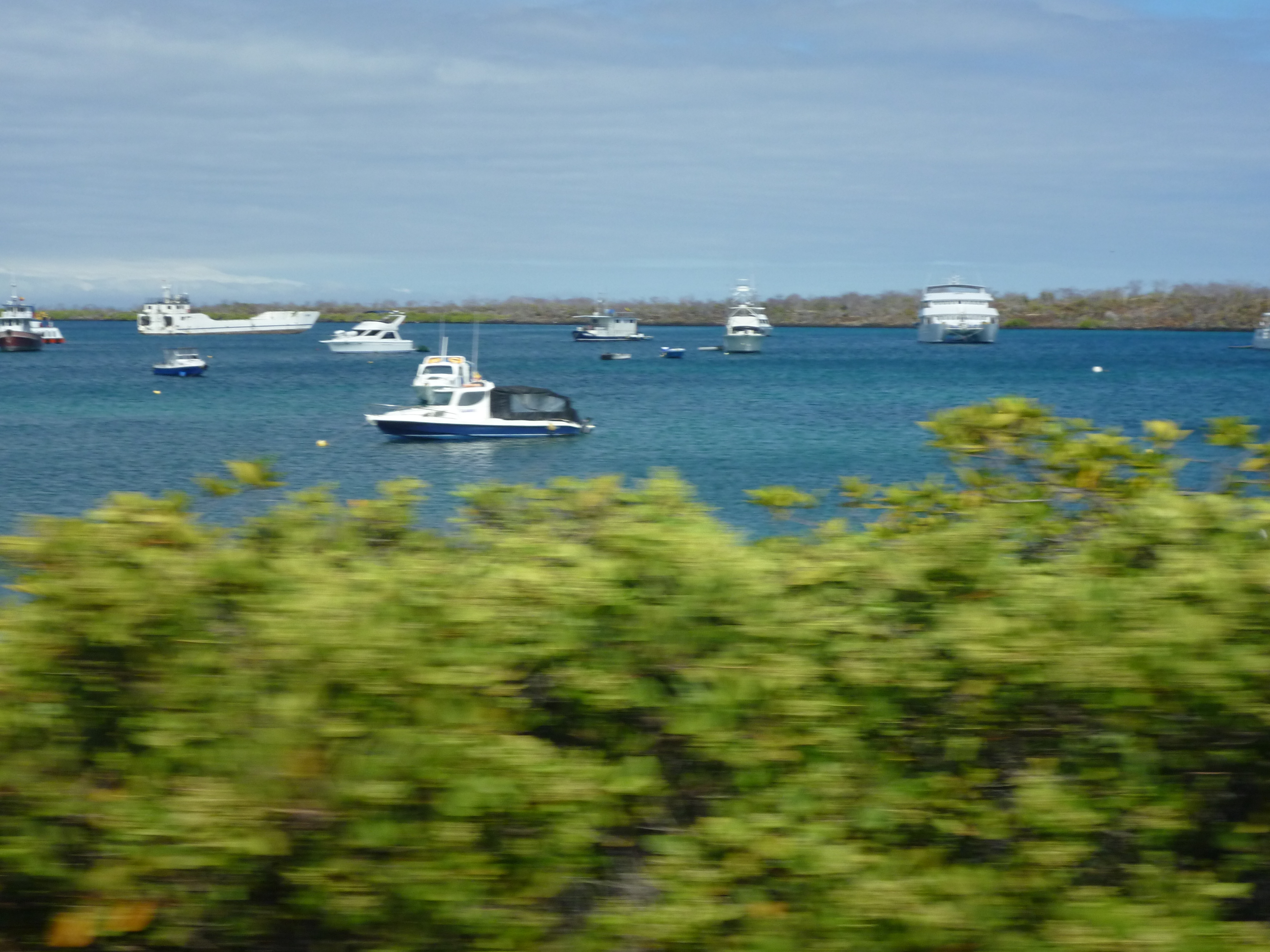
Boats off the Santa Cruz Island Galapagos in the Itabaca Channel

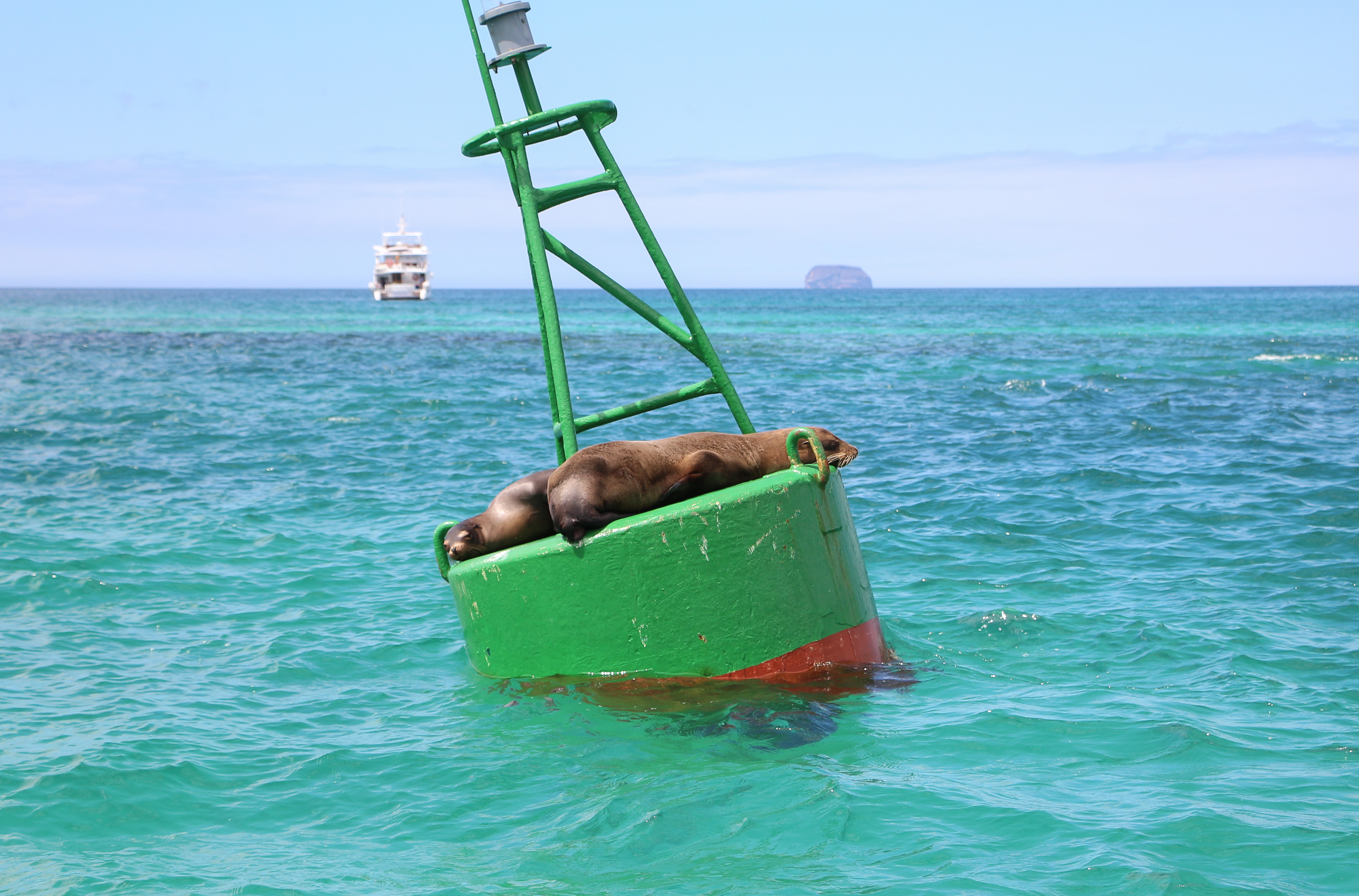
Galápagos sea lions on a buoy in the Itabaca Channel

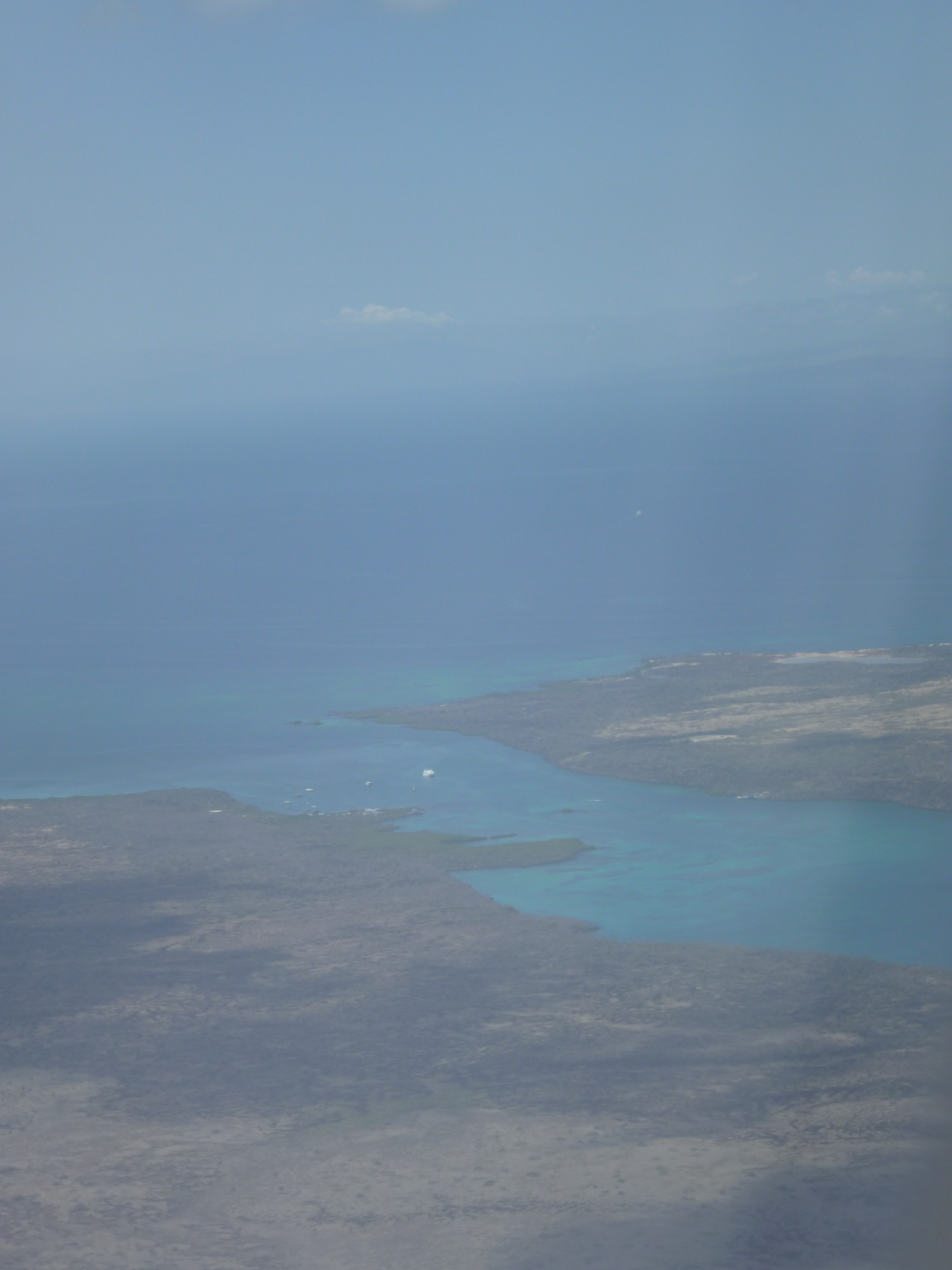
