= Black Turtle Cove =

Estuary on the Galapagos Islands

Coordinates: 0.5010°S 90.3280°W

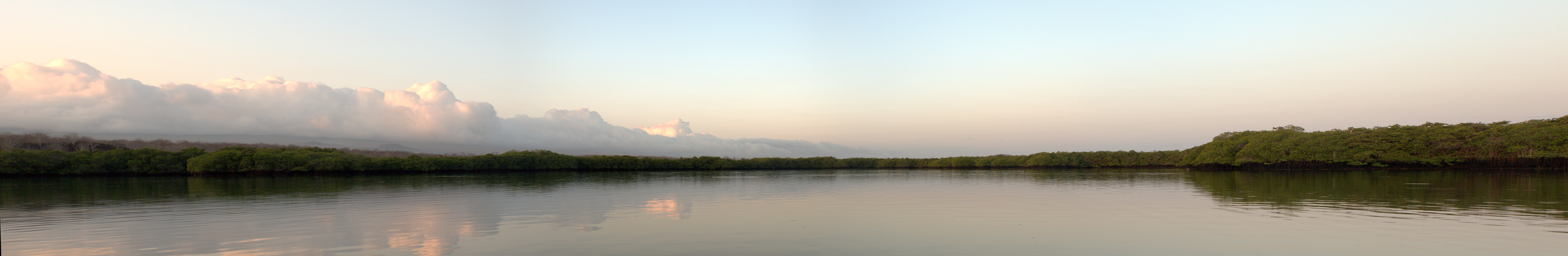
Panoramic of Black Turtle Cove

Black Turtle Cove (Spanish: Caleta Tortuga Negra) is a mangrove estuary on the northern shores of Santa Cruz Island in Ecuador's Galapagos Islands. To protect the pristine environment the national park does not allow boats with motors in operation.
