= Tortuga Bay =

Wildlife reserve on Santa Cruz Island, Galápagos

Coordinates: 0.7631°S 90.3350°W

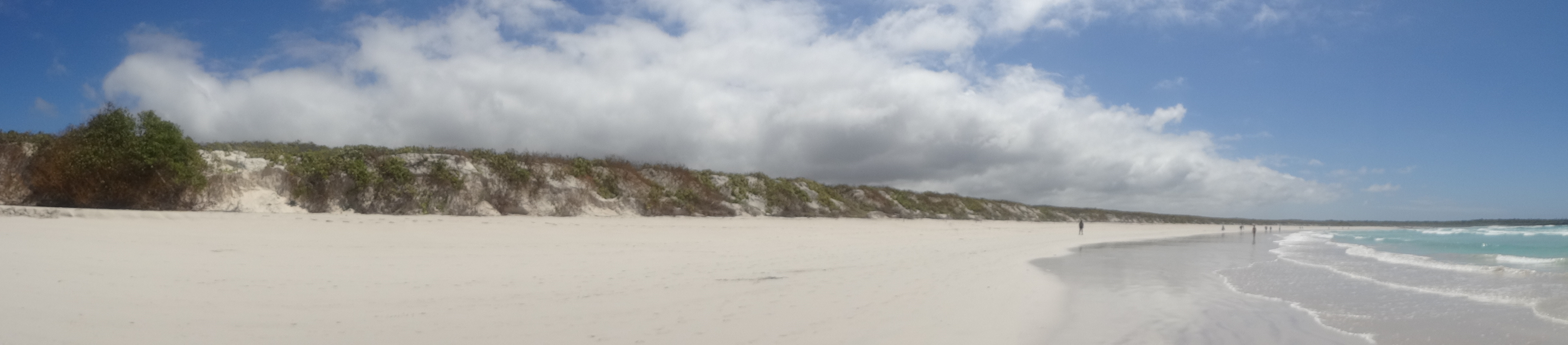
Panoramic of the beach of Tortuga Bay.

Tortuga Bay is located on the Santa Cruz Island, about a 20-minute water-taxi ride from the main water taxi dock in Puerto Ayora. There is also a walking path about 1.55 miles (2,490 m) long. Tortuga Bay has a large beach that is forbidden to swimmers and is preserved for the wildlife where many marine iguanas, galapagos crabs and birds are seen dotted along the volcanic rocks. There is a separate cove where swimming is allowed and it is common to view Whitetip reef sharks swimming in groups and on occasion tiger sharks.

The island area has a large variety of small fish, birds, including the brown pelican and Galápagos tortoises. The Galápagos Islands were discovered in 1535, and first appeared on the maps, of Gerardus Mercator and Abraham Ortelius, in about 1570. The islands were named "Insulae de los Galopegos" (Islands of the Tortoises) in reference to the giant tortoises found there. (Note: The first navigation chart showing the individual islands was drawn up by the pirate Ambrose Cowley in 1684. He named them after fellow pirates or English noblemen. More recently, the Ecuadorian government gave most of the islands Spanish names. While the Spanish names are official, many researchers continue to use the older English names, particularly as those were the names used when Darwin visited.)

== Gallery ==
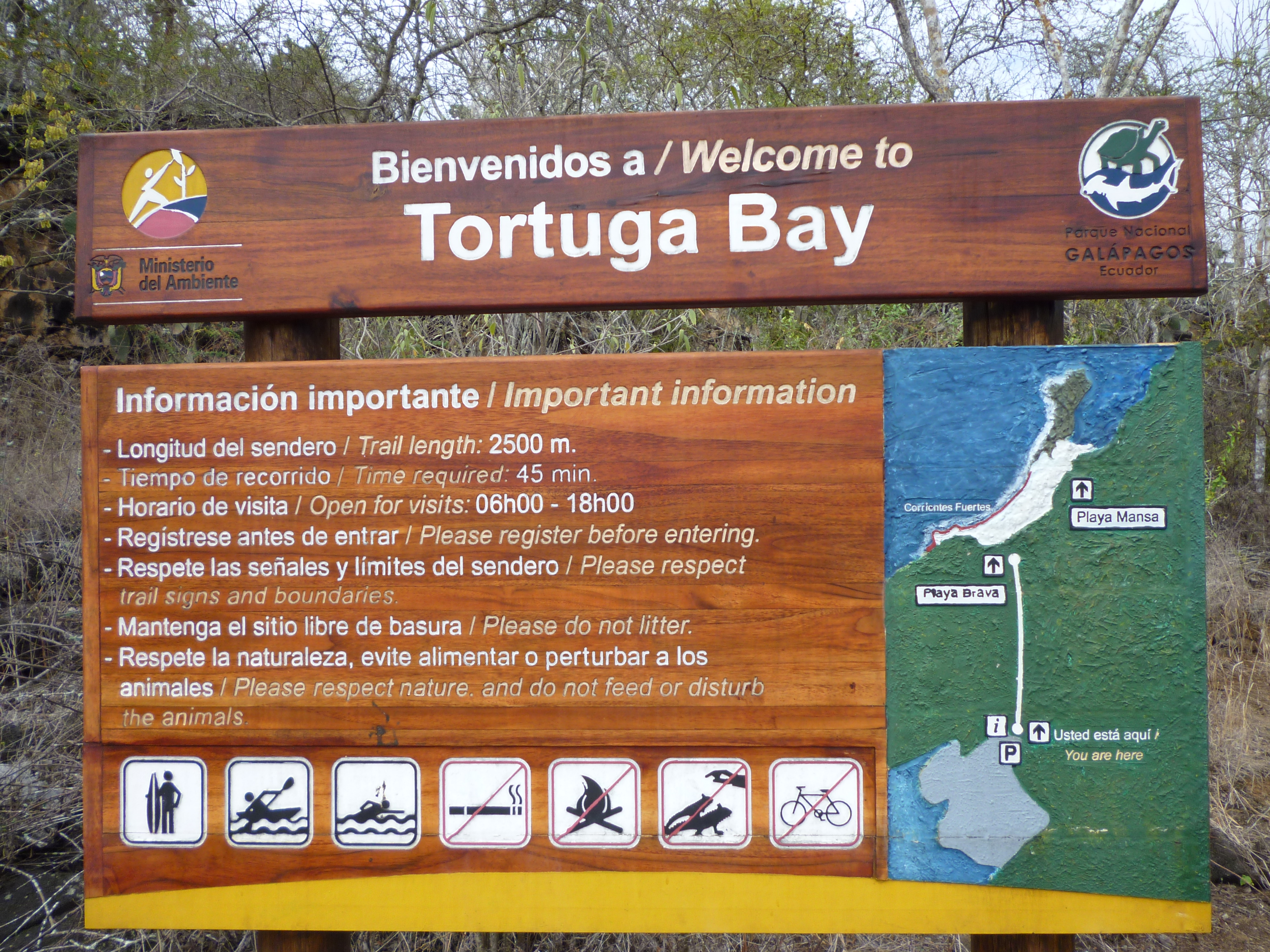
Tortuga Bay Galapagos

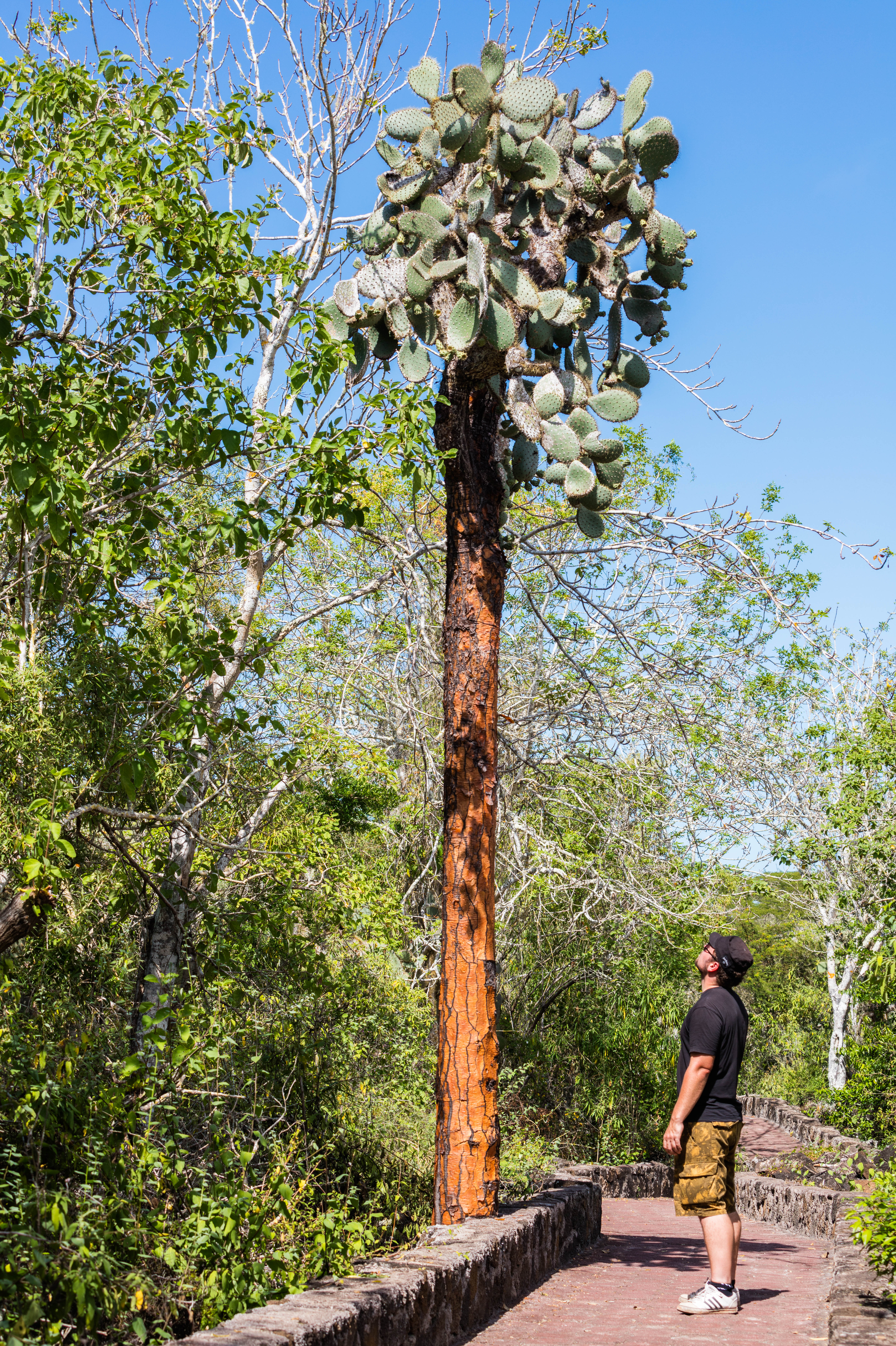
Opuntia echios on the path to the bay

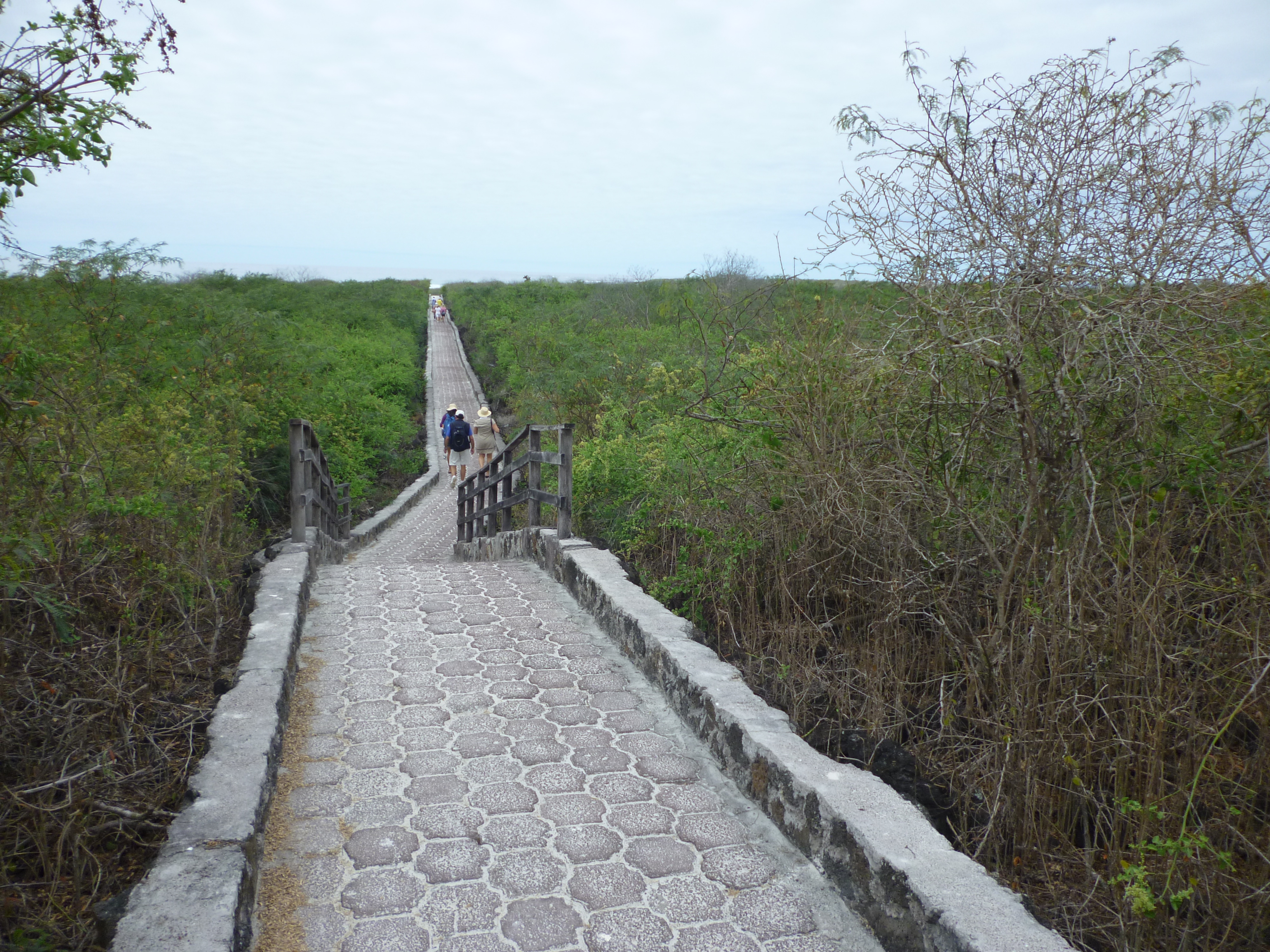
Walking path to Tortuga Bay (almost at the beach)

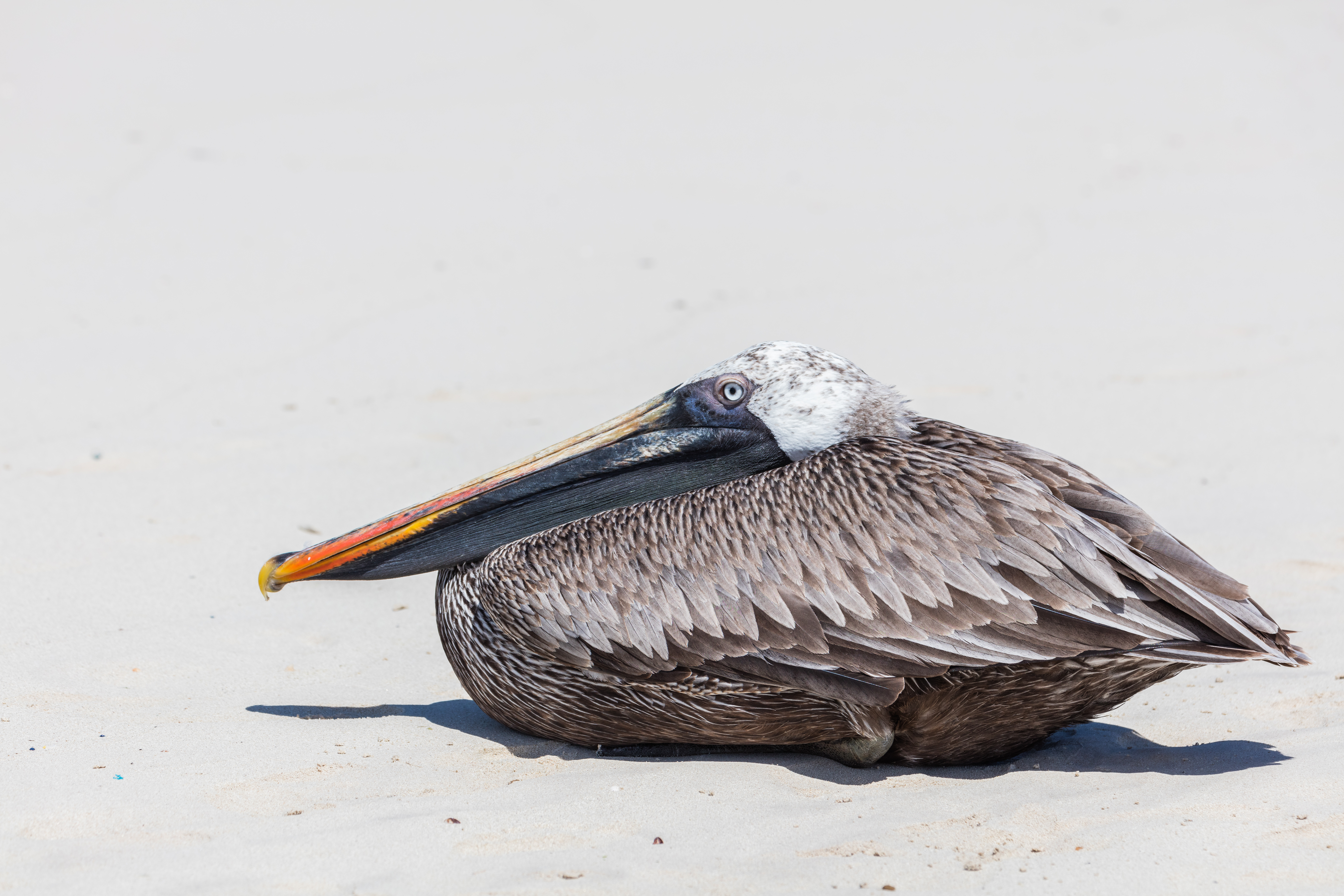
Galapagos brown pelican (Pelecanus occidentalis urinator) in Tortuga Bay

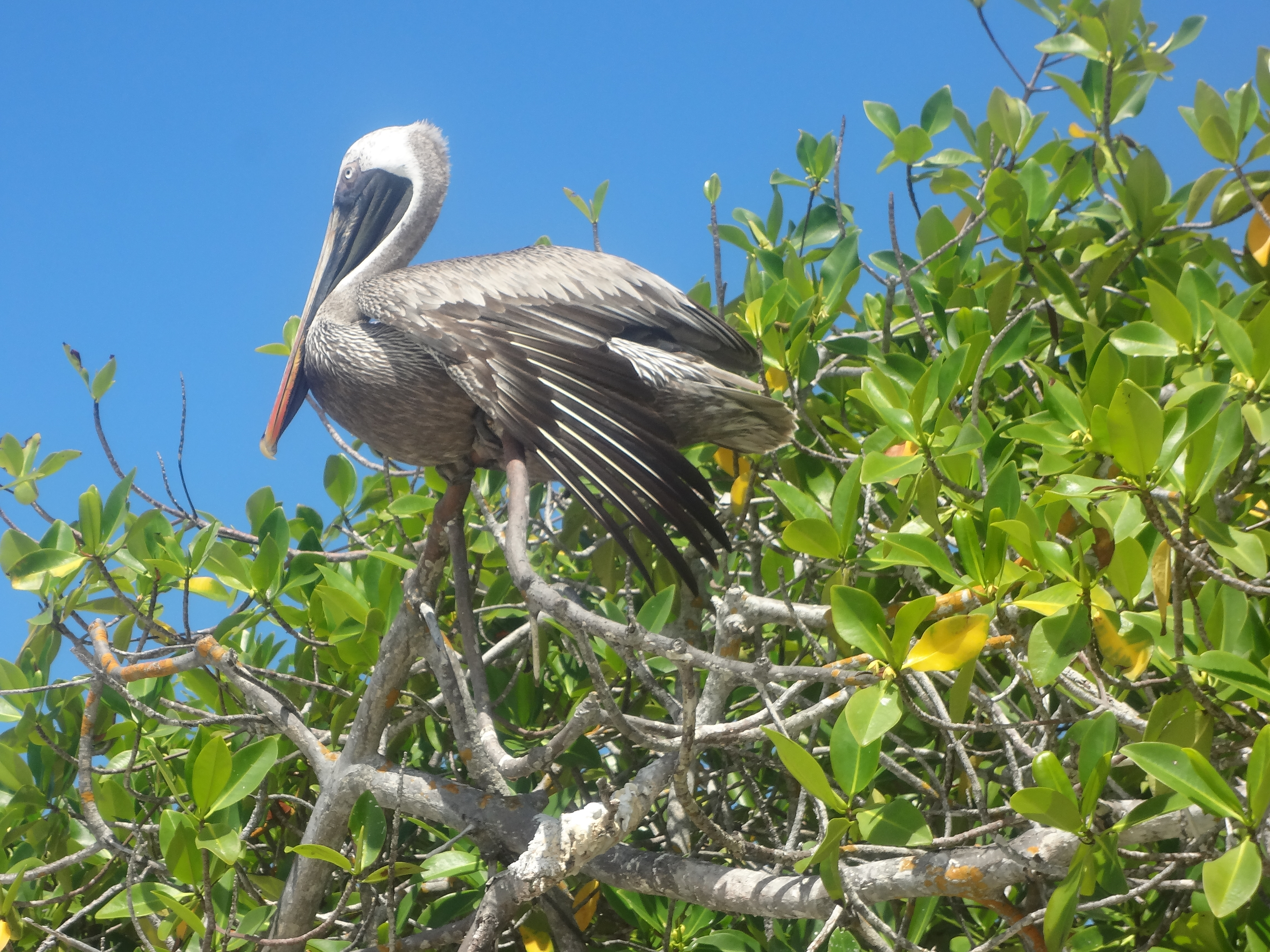
Galapagos brown pelican (Pelecanus occidentalis urinator) in Tortuga Bay.

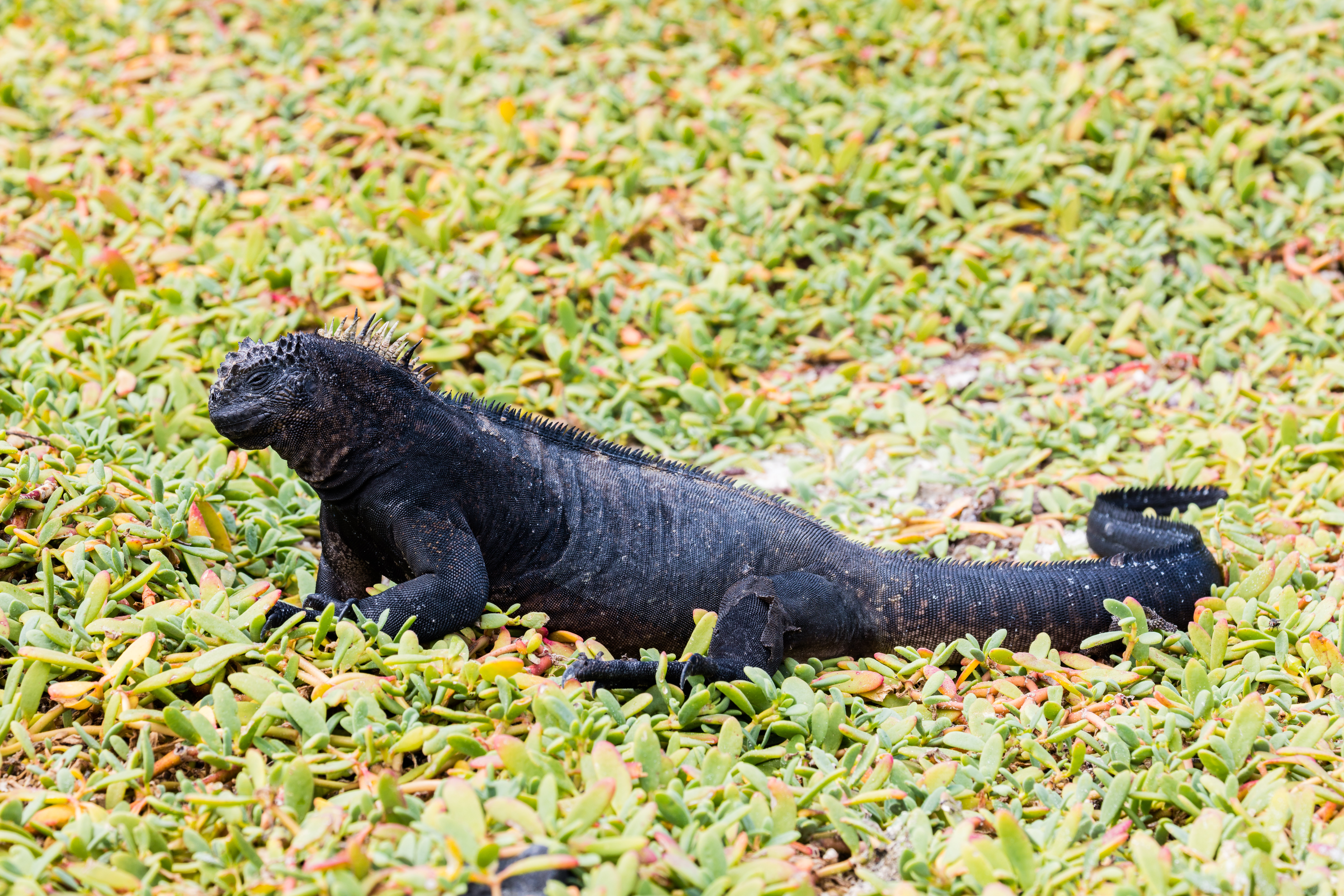
Closeup of a marine iguana (Amblyrhynchus cristatus) in Tortuga Bay

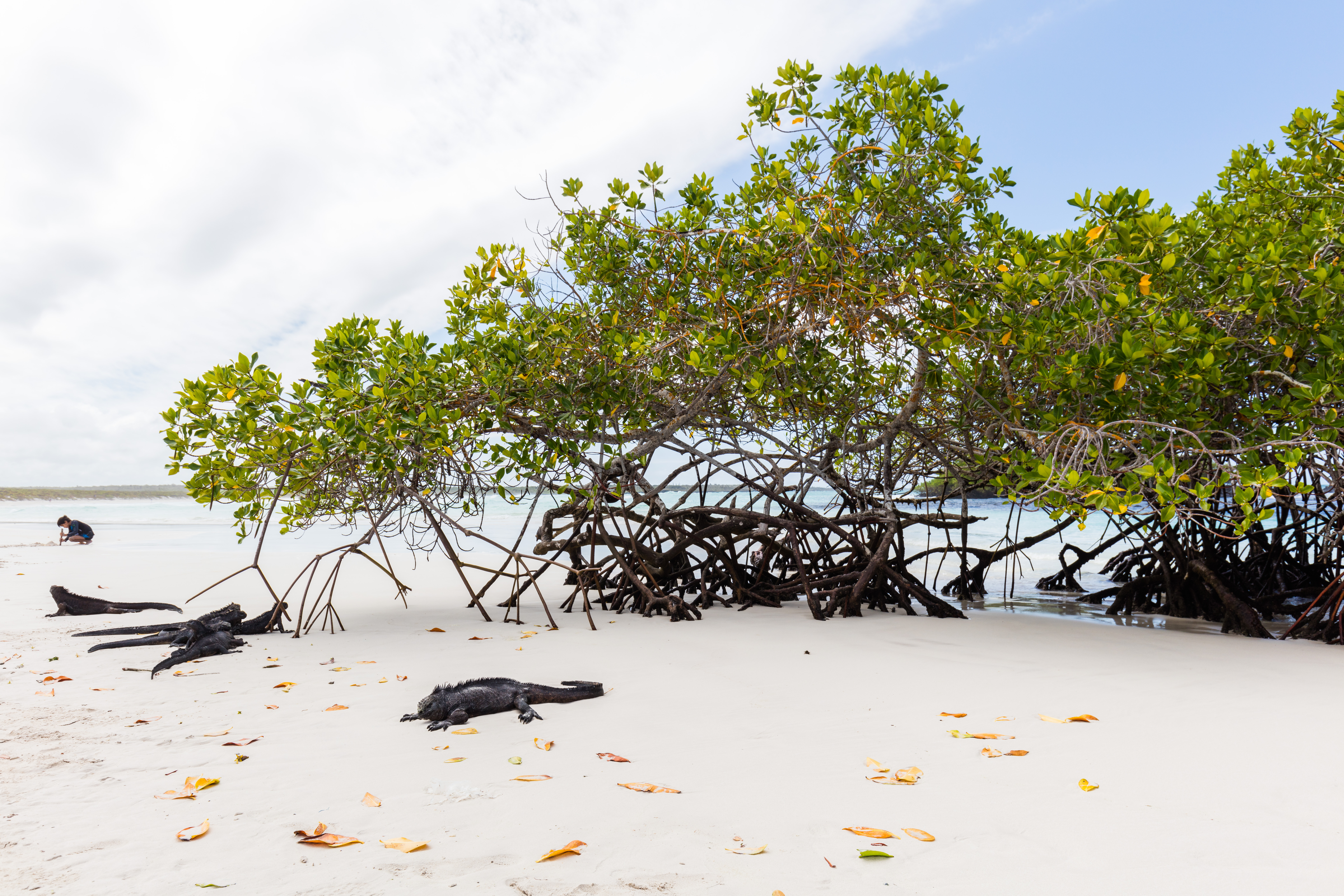
Marine iguanas (Amblyrhynchus cristatus) on the beach at Tortuga Bay

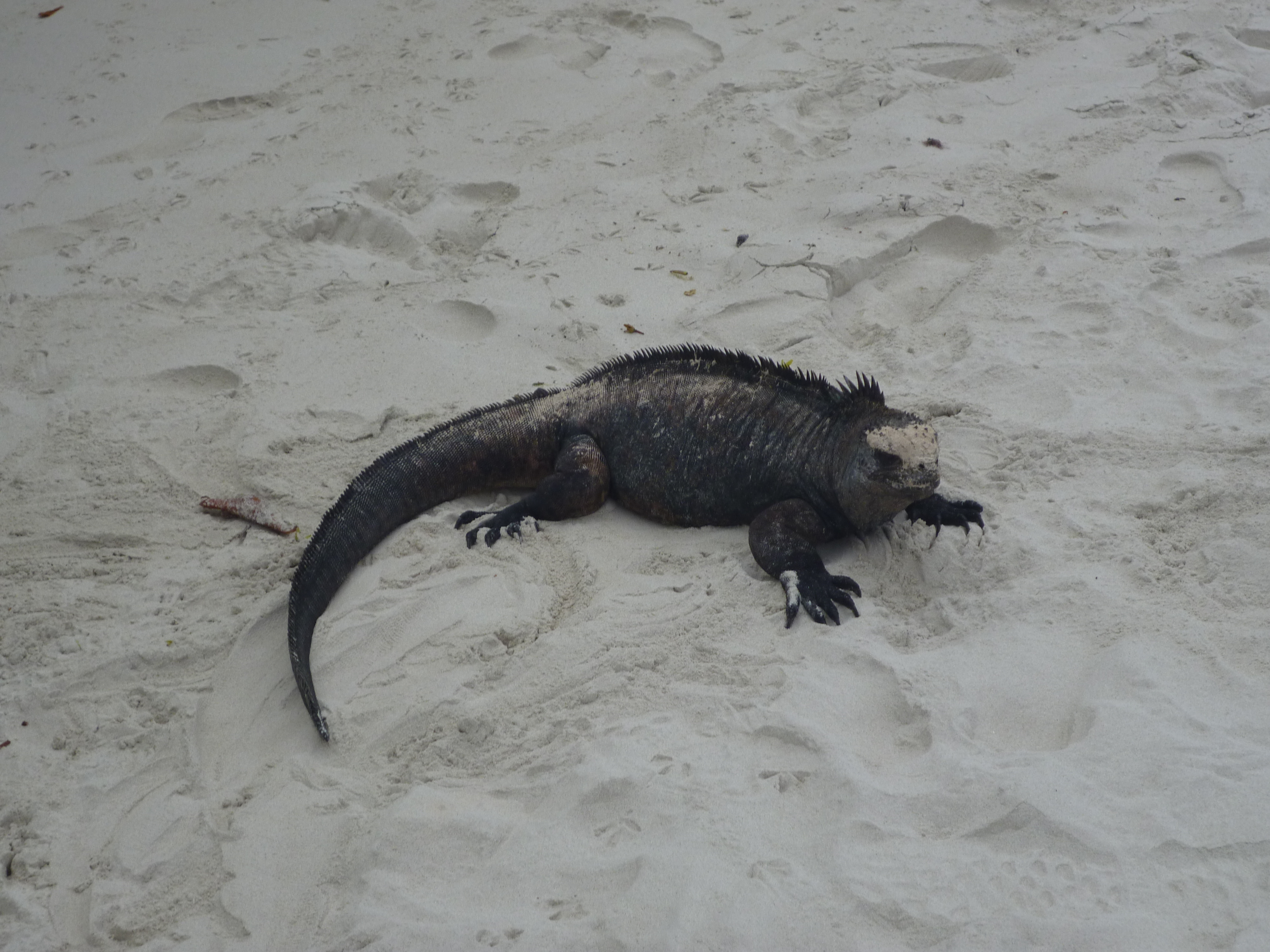
(Amblyrhynchus cristatus) in Tortuga Bay

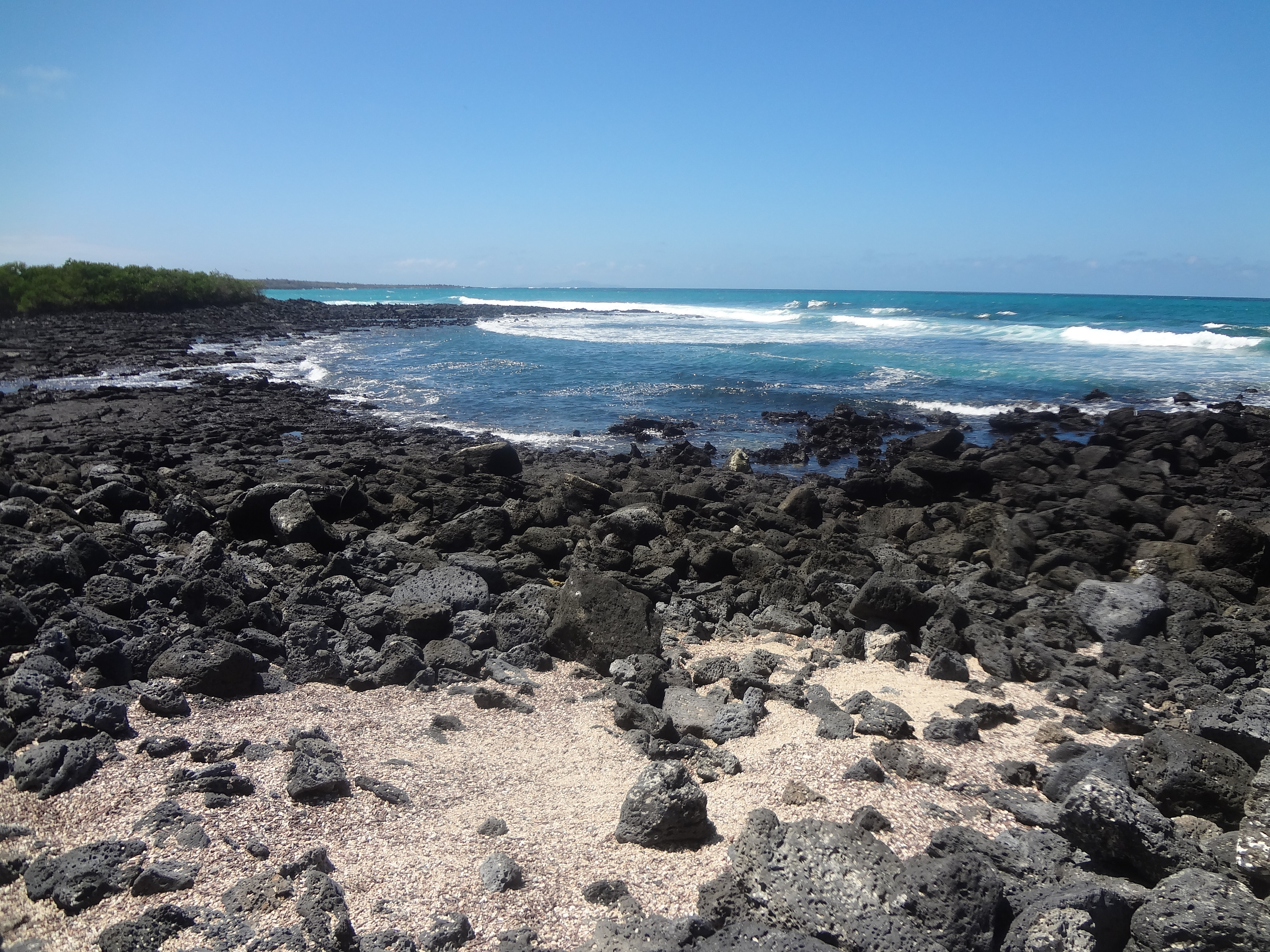
Tortuga Bay volcanic rocks

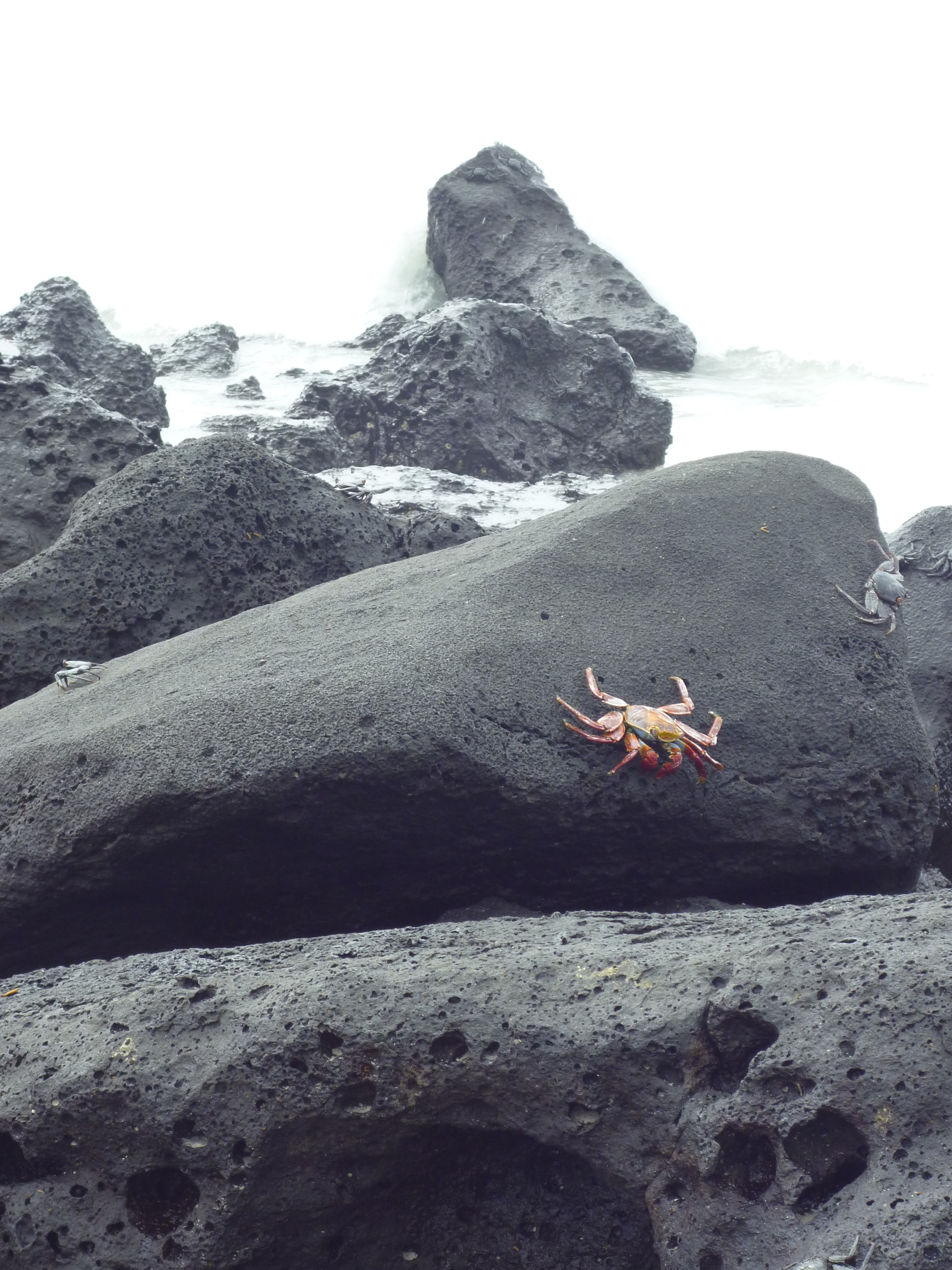
Volcanic rocks and Galapagos crabs (Grapsus grapsus)

== See also ==
- List of beaches
