= Santa Cruz Canton, Ecuador =

Santa Cruz Canton
- Canton
- Cantons of Galápagos Province
- Coordinates: 00°38′S 090°22′W
- Country: Ecuador
- Province: Galápagos Province
- Capital: Puerto Ayora

Area
  - Total: 1,804 km^{2} (697 sq mi)
- Elevation: 633 m (2,077 ft)

Population (2022 census)
  - Total: 17,233
  - Density: 9.553/km^{2} (24.74/sq mi)

Santa Cruz is a canton in the Ecuadorian province of the Galápagos. Its area covers the islands of Baltra, Bartolomé, Marchena, North Seymour, Pinta, Pinzón, Rábida, Santa Cruz, and Santiago. As of the 2006 Galápagos census, it has a population of 11,262.
