= Marchena Island =

Island in the Galapagos Archipelago in Ecuador

Marchena Island (Bindloe Island)
- Location within Galápagos Islands

Geography
- Location: Galápagos Islands, Ecuador
- Coordinates: 0.35°N 90.5°W
- Archipelago: Galápagos Islands

Administration
- Ecuador
- Province: Galápagos Province
- Canton: Santa Cruz

Marchena Island (Spanish: Isla Marchena) is one of the Galapagos Islands in Ecuador. It has an area of 130 square kilometers (50 sq mi) and reaches an elevation of 343 meters (1,125 ft) above sea level. The island does not receive visitors, although the surrounding water is used by aquatic divers on organized tours. People generally see the island as they sail around the northern part of Isabela on the way to Genovesa Island.

== Names ==
Marchena is named in honor of the Spanish monk Antonio de Marchena.

The English pirate William Ambrosia Cowley charted the island as Bindlos's Island in 1684, naming it in honor of Robert Byndloss, a chief justice of Jamaica who was related by marriage to Henry Morgan and generally sympathetic to pirates, buccaneers, and privateers. Over time, the name frequently became written as Bindlos and Bindloe Island, possibly through confusion with English captains active in the Caribbean and Pacific.

== Geography ==
Marchena has an area of 130 square kilometers (50 sq mi) and reaches an elevation of 343 meters (1,125 ft) above sea level. Marchena's nearest neighbor is Genovesa Island, about 72 kilometers (45 mi) due west.

Like many of the Galápagos volcanos, Marchena has a caldera. Marchena's caldera is roughly elliptical and measures 7 by 6 kilometers (4 by 4 miles), within the range of caldera sizes of the large western volcanoes. Marchena's caldera is unusual, however, in that it has been almost completely filled with young lavas, some of which has spilled over and down the sides. The oldest lava pools go back 500,000 years.

== See also ==
- List of volcanoes in Ecuador
