= Robert Byndloss =

Chief Justice of Jamaica

Robert Byndloss (c. 1637–1687) was chief justice of Jamaica from 1679 to 1682. The brother-in-law of Henry Morgan, Byndloss was sympathetic to pirates, buccaneers, and privateers. When Morgan lost his ability to issue letters of marque to privateers, Byndloss would direct interested captains to the French governor of Tortuga to receive a letter from him. Both Morgan and Byndloss received a commission for each such letter issued.

Marchena Island in the Galapagos Archipelago was charted by the English pirate William Ambrosia Cowley as "Bindlos's Island" in his honor in 1684, a name it bore for centuries thereafter albeit usually in the modified form "Bindloe Island". Byndloss died on Jamaica in 1687 at the age of 50. Upon his own death, Morgan left land in St George Parish, Jamaica, to Byndloss's elder son Robert. Upon Morgan's wife's death, much of Morgan's remaining wealth—including three plantations and their black slaves—passed to Byndloss's younger son Charles.
