= Baltra Island =

Island in the Galápagos Archipelago

Baltra Island (South Seymour Island)
- Location within Galápagos Islands

Geography
- Location: Galápagos Islands, Ecuador
- Coordinates: 0.457212°S 90.274332°W
- Archipelago: Galápagos Islands

Administration
- Ecuador

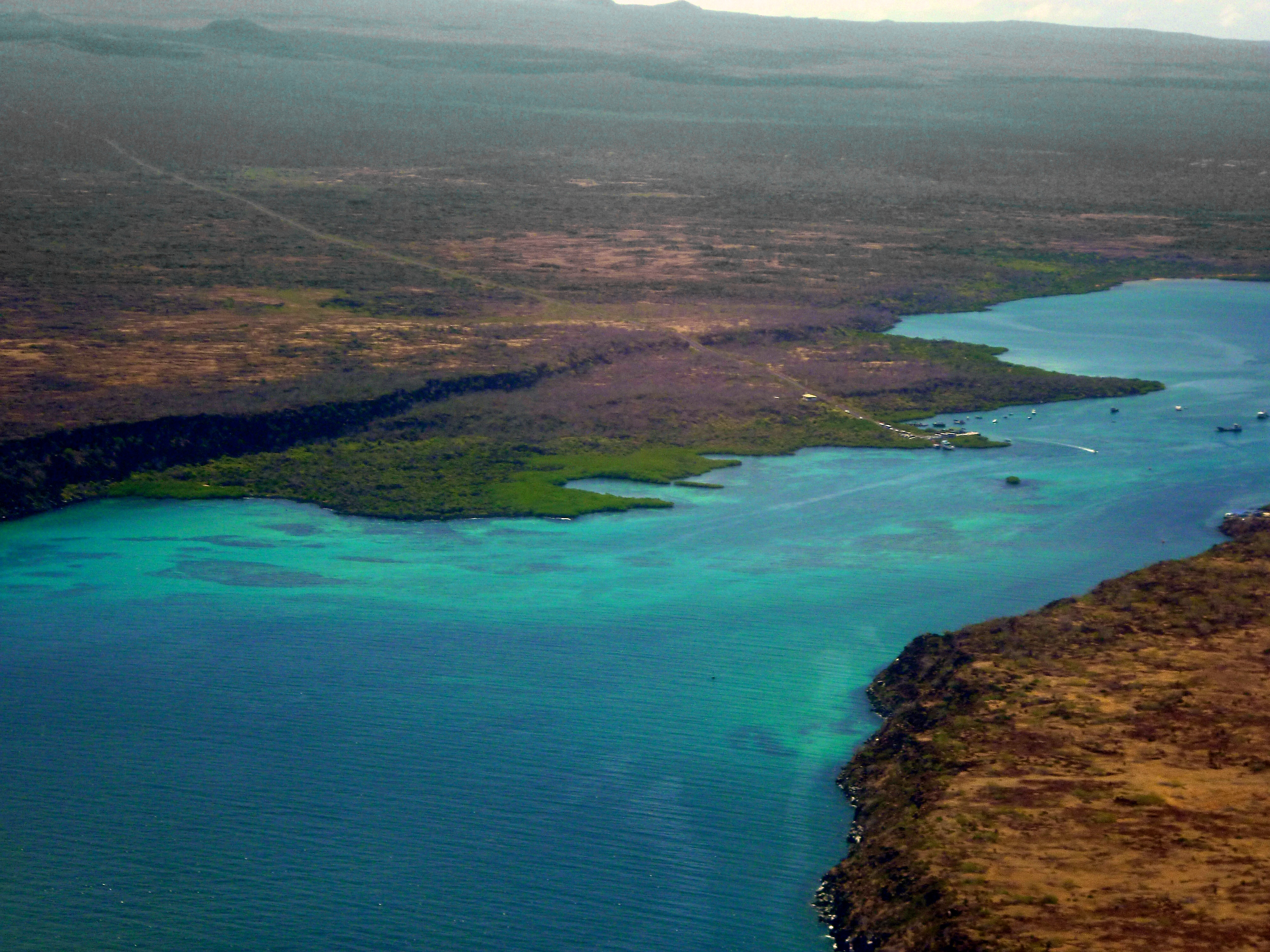
The view from an aircraft leaving Seymour Airport on Baltra (right), separated by the Itabaca Channel from Santa Cruz Island (left).

Baltra Island (Spanish: Isla Baltra) is a small island in the Galápagos Archipelago in Ecuador. It is a small flat island located near the center of the chain and includes Seymour Airport (GPS), originally established by the United States Air Force to help monitor and protect western access to the Panama Canal. Baltra is not part of the Galápagos National Park but some effort has been made to protect the local environment, including modernization of the airport and the reintroduction of the island's land iguanas.

== Names ==
Baltra is a Spanish surname particularly common in Chile. Baltra Island was probably named after Lieutenant Humberto Baltra Opazo (1884–1950), a naval officer on board the Chilean naval corvette General Baquedano which visited Galapagos for 3 weeks in 1910 to conduct a hydrographical survey of the archipelago; Lieutenant Baltra was specifically tasked with surveying Baltra Island and the Itabaca Channel between it and Santa Cruz Island. The results of the Chilean survey were sent to the UK Hydrographic Office, where the name Baltra Island was incorporated into the British Admiralty’s publication “South America Pilot” in 1911. The name was then added to a revised edition of the Admiralty's Galapagos map (Chart #1375:Galapagos Islands surveyed by Captain FitzRoy, R.N. and the Officers of H.M.S. Beagle.) in 1920.

The island is also known as South Seymour. It, North Seymour Island and the intervening islet of Mosquera were named “Seymours Isles” in 1845, in honour of George Francis Seymour, Commander-in-chief of the Pacific Station (1844–1847). This name was given by John James Onslow, captain of HMS Daphne (1838) which spent a month in Galapagos in February–March 1845.

== Geography ==
Baltra was created by geological uplift.

== Flora ==
Baltra is very arid and vegetation consists of salt bushes, prickly pear cactus and palo santo trees.

== Wildlife ==
Baltra is not within the boundaries of the Galápagos National Park. The Galápagos land iguana is the subject of an active reintroduction campaign on the island. The American Captain G. Allan Hancock moved a population of the iguanas to North Seymour Island in the early 1930s ahead of the construction of the US air base on Baltra. The development of Baltra led to the local population's extinction by 1954 but the North Seymour colony thrived and became the breeding stock for the successful Charles Darwin Research Station captive breeding program in the 1980s. In the 1990s, the land iguanas were reintroduced to Baltra. As of 1997, the new colony comprised 97 iguanas, 13 of which were born on Baltra.

== Transport ==
Seymour Airport was established by the United States Air Force during World War II. Aircraft stationed at Seymour patrolled the Eastern Pacific for Japanese and German submarines, particularly on the routes to the Panama Canal. The facilities were transferred to the government of Ecuador after the war. The old airfield and the foundations of buildings from the US base are still visible, but the field has been moved and modernized. Since 1986, air travel to the Galápagos has been shared with San Cristóbal Airport on San Cristóbal Island but private planes must fly to Seymour as it is the only airport with overnight facilities for planes. Seymour also continues service as a base for the Ecuadorian Air Force. The most recent modernization began in 2011 and was completed in 2013, after which ECOGAL, a subsidiary of the Argentinian Corporación América, will enjoy a 15-year concession to the location. ECOGAL has promoted the new airport as the "first ecological airport worldwide" due to various improvements to its energy consumption, rainwater recovery, waste recycling, and so on.

Visitors arriving at Seymour are driven by bus to two docks, one located by a small bay where tour boats await passengers, and the second the dock on the Itabaca Channel for the ferry to Santa Cruz.
