= Ruth Baltra Moreno =

Actress, playwright, teacher and theatre director

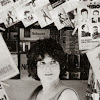
- Born: 25 December 1938; Chile
- Died: 20 April 2014 (aged 75); Santiago, Chile
- Education: University of Chile
- Occupations: Actress, dramatist, teacher, theater director
- Years active: 1959–2014

Ruth Baltra Moreno (25 December 1938 – 20 April 2014) was a Chilean actress, playwright, teacher, and theater director. An active participant in social organization and distinguished for her work in children's and youth theater, she was the founder of the Organization of Children's Culture and Art (OCARIN).

== Biography ==
At age 16, Ruth Baltra Moreno finished her education in humanities and began to study performing arts at the University of Chile's School of Theater under the direction of Pedro de la Barra. She began her theatrical career in 1959.

The year of her graduation, she traveled to Uruguay and Argentina with Víctor Jara, Alejandro Sieveking, Tomás Vidiella, Sergio Zapata, and Sergio Urrutia. In Argentina she discovered her vocation was not to act but to teach. She became a theater educator in Buenos Aires, continuing in this role for years, eventually deciding to return to Chile due to family and health issues.

She dedicated more than 50 years to the theater, dramaturgy, and children's theater, the latter being the focus of her greatest effort. In all she was responsible for 56 theatrical plays, 15 children's stories, and three books.

On 6 December 2011, a tribute to Baltra was held in the Antonio Varas room of the National Theater.

During her last years she was afflicted by cancer, though she continued to participate in activities. She was writing History and Universal Repertoire of Children's Theater and The Violet Princess, Five Dog Stories and One Ecological, a compilation of her stories. She died on 20 April 2014, as a result of the cancer's progression.

== Passage through Argentina ==
In Argentina Baltra discovered her vocation was not to act but to teach. She studied pedagogy at El Salvador University, psychodrama with Jaime Rojas Bermúdez and Eduardo Pawlosky, breathing for asthmatic children at Ramos Mejías Hospital, children's direction and dramaturgy with the General Society of Argentine Authors (ARGENTORES), and participated in several conferences related to children's theater.

In Buenos Aires, in October 1962, she founded "El Duendecito Arlequín" School of Children's Theater, named for the protagonist of her first play for children, El País Encantado De Los Señores Duendes. This same character starred in a series on Buenos Aires television Channel 9, El Travesuras del Duendecito Harlequin, which gained a large audience. Baltra created a radio program, Pacotilla, el Rey de la Pandilla, of great success and duration. She wrote and directed works for children and adolescents in theaters, educational establishments, shantytowns, and hospitals when hired by the Municipality of Buenos Aires. She traveled to festivals and meetings held in Montevideo and Curitiba, where she met and talked with the playwright Maria Clara Machado.

In 1965 she participated in the film Pajarito Gómez.

== Return to Chile ==
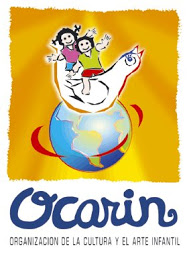
OCARIN's original 1979 logo, created by a 12-year-old boy from the La Palmilla community of the Metropolitan Region

In 1967 Ruth Baltra Moreno visited Chile to assemble the work El País Encantado de los Señores Duendes at the Municipal Theater of Santiago. In 1969 she founded the Municipal School of Child-Youth Theater, with whose students she participated in many activities. In 1972, she participated with all her students in the inauguration of the UNTAD and presented the work Los Papeleros for the diplomats of that meeting.

She traveled on the Children's Culture Train to the South of Chile, presenting the work of Isidora Aguirre in free adaptation for children. That same year she enrolled in the University of Chile's School of Theater in the course of Stage Design and Lighting, and gave her thesis on "The History of Children's Theater" before Sergio Aguirre, Fernando Gonzáles, and José Pineda.

In the International Year of the Child, 1979, she founded the Organization of Children's Culture and Art (OCARIN).

The OCARIN School of Theater and Dance was a hotbed and, at the same time, a site of peace, friendship and happiness. This school, which was located at 464 Arturo Prat, was set on fire in 1989.

During the 1990s, Baltra taught several workshops in different organizations, among which were Facetas cultural center, Bertolt Brecht cultural center, and various municipal organizations, always under the name of OCARIN. Despite not having the same success as in Argentina, Ruth Baltra Moreno never stopped working and dedicating herself to children. One of her main objectives was to enable art education and specifically to see that theatrical art was inserted into the curricular mesh of the National Education System, to counter the elimination of one hour of musical education and the plastic arts.

Throughout her career, she attended and assisted in the organization of world congresses and encounters, receiving awards and recognition.

== Works ==
Ruth Baltra Moreno wrote 56 theatrical works and 15 stories for children. She published three books – El País Encantado de los Señores Duendes (1965 in Argentina), Rayito de Sol (1986 in Chile), and Teatro infantil, para jugar, para crear, ¡Para el aula! (2003).

=== Assistance and organization of world congresses and meetings ===
- 1979 – To celebrate the "International Year of the Child", Baltra organized The First Congress of the Child Made by Children, carried out with more than two hundred Children and Adolescents of Community and Educational Organizations, clandestinely in the Parish of Santa Rosa del Parral, with a closing and full in the Caupolicán Theater.
- 1985 – She carried out the Second Congress of the Child Made by Children, inaugurated in the Teatro Cariola with the attendance of 400 children and the participation of the sons and daughters of exiles who could enter the country. To motivate this activity, most of the communes of the Metropolitan Region and some other nearby cities were visited. In its evaluation, OCARIN verified the participation of nearly 10,000 children, adolescents and young people.
- August 2002 – She participated again with the students of OCARIN, in the First International Puppetry and Theater Festival in Jujuy, Argentina, with the play ¿Dónde está mi Niño Araucano?
- 2003 – Together with its students of the School of Theater and Dance, OCARIN participated in the 9th International Festival of Culture, with the work Sembremos de amor o planro, organized in the city of Potosí, Bolivia, where it corresponded to declare 150 Bolivian children "Messengers of Peace" on behalf of UNESCO Chile.
- May 2003 – Baltra was invited by the "Nosotros" Center of Pedagogical Alternatives to Lima, Peru, sponsored by the National Institute of Dramatic Art and Ministry of Education of Peru, to present two conferences, on children's theater and "The History of Children's Theater".
- April 2004 – She was invited to the 23rd Forum for Preschool Education in Morelia, Mexico.
- July 2004 – She participated in the 5th "Idea/Drama" World Theater-Education Congress held in Ottawa, Canada. Together with her students she participated in the 8th World Festival of Children's Theater held in Havana, Cuba with the works Vida, obra y eternidad de mi mismo (a biography of Pablo Neruda) and ¿Quién le quebró la patita a la tenquita?
- January 2005 – She was invited by the Directorate of the World Social Forum to explain the importance of children's theater in children and adolescents in the city of Porto Alegre, Brazil.
- January 2006 – She organized the First Global Children and Children's Theater Meeting (EMTIJ). Its seat was the commune of La Florida, with the sub-headquarters San Joaquín, Lampa, Puente Alto, Rancagua and Talca. 42 groups and theater companies from Argentina, Uruguay, Peru, Bolivia, Ecuador, Paraguay, Brazil, Venezuela, Colombia, Mexico, Spain, Uganda, and Cape Verde participated.
- January 2007 – She participated in the ASSITEJ Congress in Buenos Aires.
- February 2007 – She held the Second Global Meeting of Children and Youth Dance and Theater, whose headquarters were the communes of Santiago, San Joaquín, Conchalí, Central Station, Talca, Navidad, Rengo, Tilcoco, and Coquimbo.
- March 2009 – The Third World Forum of Specialists in Children's-Youth Literature, Road to the Bicentennial, took place. Leading exhibitors from Latin America and Europe participated in the event: Germany, Spain, Mexico, Colombia, Brazil, Argentina, Uruguay, Bolivia, Peru And Chile.
- October 2013 – The 7th World Meeting of Theater and Dance for Children and Youth and 4th Congress of Specialists in Children's Dramaturgy were held, from 18 to 26 October.

== Awards and recognitions ==
In 1989, Ruth Baltra Moreno was the winner of the 1st and 2nd place in the National School Festival of the Ministry of Education, with the play ¿Juguemos al cuento? taking 1st place, and El maravilloso mundo del eian y la mimosa taking 2nd.

In 1996 she was chosen the Best Social Leader in Puente Alto, Comuna, Metropolitan Region for her contribution to culture and the realization of the First Festival of Children's Theater.

In the year 2000, she was named a UNESCO Messenger of Peace.

In 2001 she was chosen as the Best Cultural Director La Florida, Metropolitan Region for her work in the School of Children's and Youth Theater in the commune's House of Culture.

On 6 December 2011, a tribute was held in the Antonio Varas room of the National Theater.
