= Puerto Ayora =

- Town
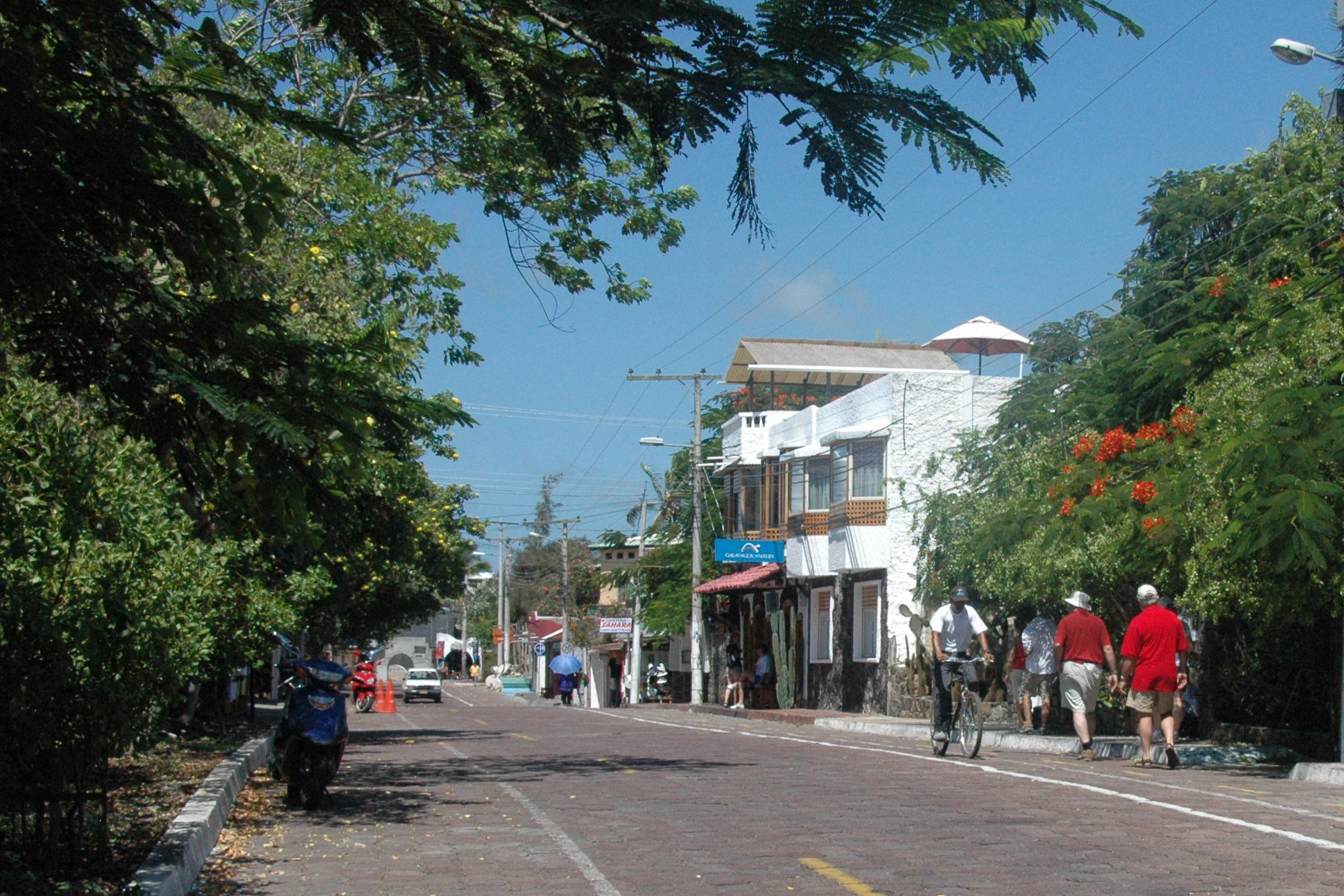
- Motto: "The Heart of the Galápagos"
- Location within Galápagos Islands
- Coordinates: 0°45′0″S 90°19′0″W
- Country: Ecuador
- Province: Galápagos
- Canton: Santa Cruz
- Parishes: List of urban parishes

Area
  - Town: 2.71 km^{2} (1.05 sq mi)

Population (2022 census)
  - Town: 12,697
  - Density: 4,690/km^{2} (12,100/sq mi)
- Time zone: UTC-6 (GALT)
- Climate: BSh

Puerto Ayora, sometimes referred to as Santa Cruz, is a town in central Galápagos, Ecuador, on the southern shore of Santa Cruz Island. It is the seat of Santa Cruz Canton and is named for Isidro Ayora, a president of Ecuador. Puerto Ayora is the most populous town in the Galápagos Islands, with a population of 12,696.

It is home to the Charles Darwin Foundation, Galápagos National Park, and the Charles Darwin Research Station.

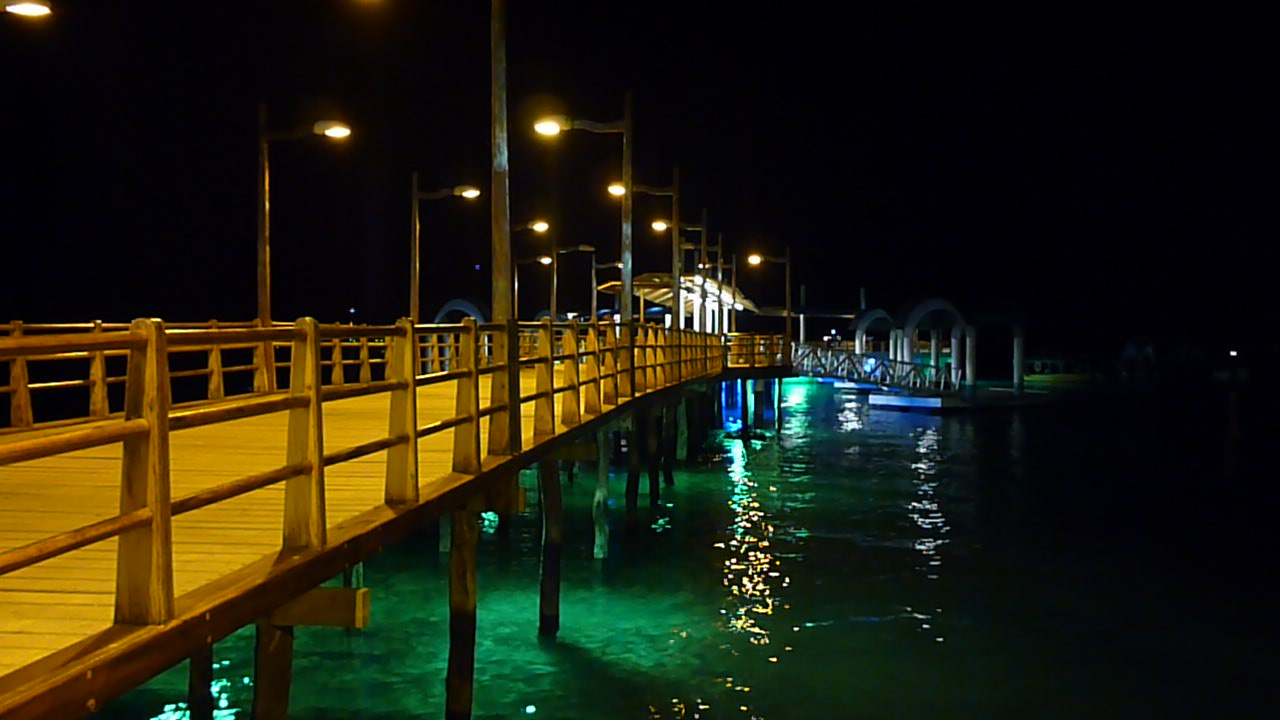
Santa Cruz Island at the docks of Puerto Ayora

== Climate ==
Puerto temperatures vary between 18 and 29 °C (64 and 84 °F). The hot season usually runs from December to May.
