= Santa Cruz Island (Galápagos) =

Island of the Galápagos Islands

Santa Cruz Island (Indefatigable Island)
- Location within Galápagos Islands

Geography
- Location: Pacific Ocean
- Coordinates: 0.6255°S 90.3679°W
- Archipelago: Galápagos Islands
- Area: 986 km^{2} (381 sq mi)
- Highest elevation: 864 m (2835 ft)
- Highest point: Cerro Crocker

Administration
- Ecuador

Demographics
- Population: 15,701 (2015)

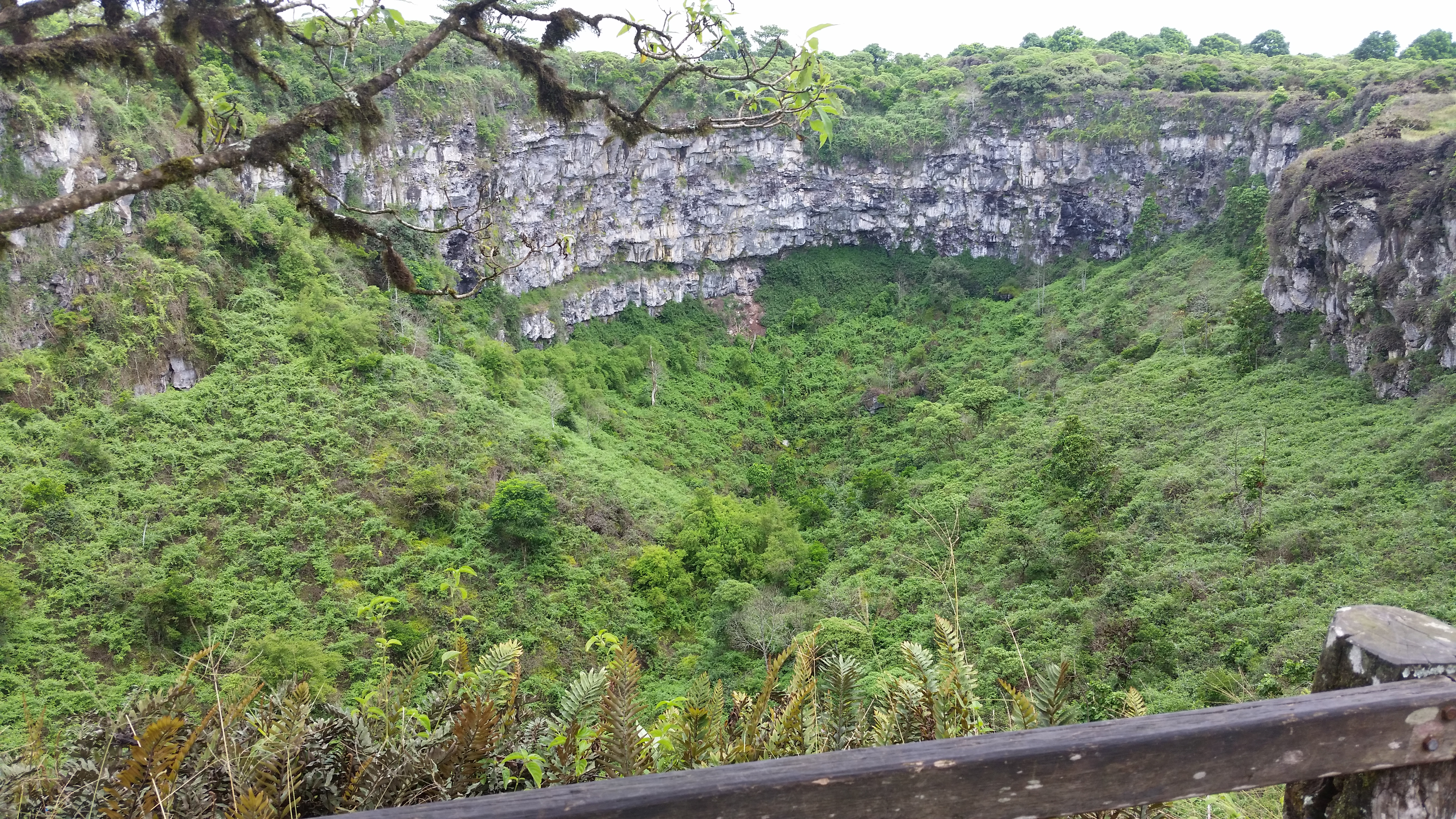
One of the twin craters, Los Gemelos, that bracket Santa Cruz Highway in the highlands

Santa Cruz Island (Spanish: Isla Santa Cruz), also known as Indefatigable Island and by other names, is the most populous and second-largest island in the Galápagos Islands, Ecuador. Situated in the middle of the group, Santa Cruz is a shield volcano with an area of 986 km^{2} (381 sq mi) and a maximum altitude of 864 m (2,835 ft). The seat of Santa Cruz Canton is Puerto Ayora on Santa Cruz. The island's total population is around 18,000 with those living in smaller villages chiefly working in agriculture and cattle raising.

== Names ==
The island's original Spanish name was San Clemente Island (Isla or Ysla San Clemente) in honor of St. Clement. This was changed to Bolivia Island (Isla Bolivia) in honor of the South American revolutionary hero Simón Bolívar upon the islands' annexation by Ecuador in 1832 and then to Santa Cruz ([ˈsanta ˈkɾus], "Holy Cross") in reference to the cross upon which Jesus was crucified during the 1892 renaming of the islands upon the quadricentennial of Christopher Columbus's first voyage. It was also sometimes known as Chavez Island (Isla Chávez).

The English pirate William Ambrosia Cowley named the island the Duke of Norfolk's Island in 1684, later shortened to Norfolk Island, in honor of either Henry Howard, 6th Duke of Norfolk, or his son Henry, the 7th Duke of Norfolk, or possibly both. It was later renamed Indefatigable Island in honor of the third-rate ship of the line HMS Indefatigable, which distinguished itself during the Napoleonic Wars and later saw service in the Royal Navy's South America squadron.

== Geography ==
Santa Cruz is an oval-shaped island 32 km (20 mi) long and 40 km (25 mi) wide. It has an area of 986 km^{2} (381 sq mi) and a maximum altitude of 864 m (2,835 ft). Santa Cruz is the second-largest island after Isabela.

=== Geology ===
The island is a shield volcano. Its summit contains a shallow caldera that has been largely buried by youthful pit craters and cinder cones with well-preserved craters. The most recent eruptions may have occurred only a few thousand years ago with the effusion of sparsely vegetated lava flows from vents on the north flank and along the summit fissure. A gigantic lava tube measuring over 2,000 m (6,600 ft) long is a tourist attraction on the island. As a testimony to its volcanic history there are two big holes formed by the collapse of a magma chamber known as "The Twins" (Los Gemelos).

=== Plant life ===
Tortuga Bay is located on the Santa Cruz Island near Puerto Ayora where fauna such as marine iguanas, birds, Galapagos crabs can be seen. There is also a mangrove where white tip reef sharks and the gigantic Galápagos tortoises can be sighted.

== Climate ==
Climate data for Santa Cruz Island (Charles Dawin Research Station), elevation 6 m (20 ft), (1971–2000)
Month	Jan	Feb	Mar	Apr	May	Jun	Jul	Aug	Sep	Oct	Nov	Dec	Year
Mean daily maximum °C (°F)	28.3 (82.9)	30.0 (86.0)	30.6 (87.1)	29.9 (85.8)	27.6 (81.7)	25.9 (78.6)	24.5 (76.1)	23.9 (75.0)	24.1 (75.4)	24.7 (76.5)	25.4 (77.7)	26.4 (79.5)	26.8 (80.2)
Mean daily minimum °C (°F)	22.2 (72.0)	20.0 (68.0)	22.8 (73.0)	22.8 (73.0)	22.0 (71.6)	20.7 (69.3)	19.8 (67.6)	19.1 (66.4)	19.1 (66.4)	19.4 (66.9)	20.1 (68.2)	20.9 (69.6)	20.7 (69.3)
Average precipitation mm (inches)	65.0 (2.56)	63.0 (2.48)	38.0 (1.50)	58.0 (2.28)	9.0 (0.35)	5.0 (0.20)	11.0 (0.43)	8.0 (0.31)	11.0 (0.43)	11.0 (0.43)	10.0 (0.39)	17.0 (0.67)	306 (12.03)
Average relative humidity (%)	85	83	81	82	84	83	82	82	83	81	81	83	83
Source: FAO

== Demographics ==
Santa Cruz hosts the largest human population in the archipelago at the town of Puerto Ayora, with a total of 18,000 residents on the island.

== Points of interest ==
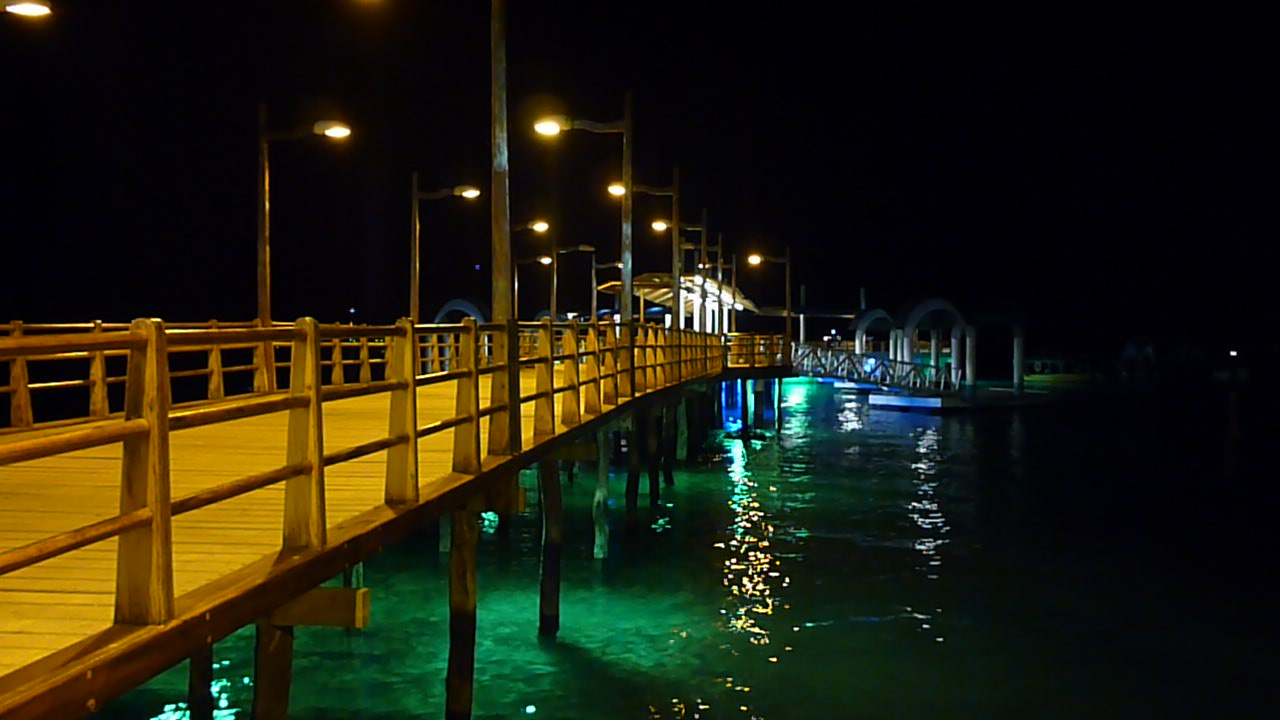
Puerto Ayora, at night

- Charles Darwin Research Station
- Headquarters of the Galápagos National Park Service
- Lava tubes
- El Chato and Rancho Primicias Giant Tortoise Reserves
- Itabaca Channel
- Black Turtle Cove
- Cerro Dragón
- Tortuga Bay
- Playa El Garrapatero
- Los Gemelos
- Stand of Scalesia - daisy trees

== Sister cities ==
On June 19, 2002, the cities of Seabrook, Texas and Santa Cruz Island finalized a sister city status during a ceremony at Seabrook City Hall.
