= Diego (disambiguation) =

Diego is a Spanish male name.

Diego may also refer to:

== People ==
- Diego (given name), including a list of people with the given name
- Diego (surname), including a list of people with the surname

== Music and entertainment ==
- Go, Diego, Go!, a US children's television show
- Diego (band), an indie rock band from Germany
- Diego (Ice Age), a Smilodon from the children's animated movie franchise Ice Age
- Diego (album), a 2005 album by Diego Boneta

== Other uses ==
- Diego antigen system, a system of blood groups
- Diego (grape) or Vigiriega, a Spanish grape
- Diego's Hair Salon, in Washington, D.C.
- Diego (store), a Hungarian retail chain
- Diego (tortoise), a Hood Island giant tortoise
- Winter Storm Diego, a December 2018 storm in the United States

== See also ==
- San Diego (disambiguation)
