= Diadochus =

Diodochus is the Latinized form of diadochos (Greek: διάδοχος, “heir, successor”). It can refer to:

Personal name

- Marcus Diadochus, 4th-century Christian writer
- Diadochos of Photiki, 5th-century Christian saint
- Proclus Diadochus, 5th-century Neoplatonic philosopher

Scientific names

- Marginella diadochus, a species of Marginellid sea snail
- Diadochite, a mineral
- Diadochokinesia, the ability to make antagonistic movements in quick succession
- Dysdiadokokinesia and adiadokokinesia, the medical terms for impaired or absent ability to make rapid alternating movements

Other

- Diadochi, successors of Alexander the Great
  - Wars of the Diadochi
- Diadochoupolis, a city in Mesopotamia
- Diadochos, the title of the Crown Prince of Greece

== See also ==
- Successor (disambiguation)
- Epigonus (disambiguation)
