= Diego =

Male given name

- Gender: Male

Origin
- Region of origin: Spain

Other names
- Related names: Diogo

Diego is a Spanish masculine given name. The Portuguese equivalent is Diogo. The onomastics of Diego is disputed, with two major origin hypotheses: Tiago and Didacus.

The name also has several patronymic derivations, listed below.

== Onomatology ==
=== Tiago hypothesis ===
Diego has long been interpreted as variant of Tiago (also spelled as Thiago), an abbreviation of Santiago, from the older Sant Yago "Saint Jacob", in English known as Saint James or as San-Tiago (cf. San Diego). This has been the standard interpretation of the name since at least the 19th century, as it was reported by Robert Southey in 1808 and by Apolinar Rato y Hevia (1891). The suggestion that this identification may be a folk etymology, i.e. that Diego (and Didacus; see below) may be of another origin and only later identified with Jacobo, is made by Buchholtz (1894), though this possibility is judged as improbable by the author.

=== Didacus hypothesis ===
In the later 20th century, the traditional identification of Diego = Jacobo came to be seen as untenable. Malkiel (1975) calls the equation an "odd couple" (Spanish: extraña pareja). The name Didacus, while unattested in antiquity, predates the earliest record of the form Diego. The oldest record for Didacus according to Floriano (1949) dates to 747, with numerous further records during the 9th century. Becker (2009) argues against possible derivation from the Greek name Diadochus, but also against suggestions of Basque and Celtic derivations.

Didacus is recorded in the forms Diaco and Diago in the 10th century. The form Diego is first recorded in the late 11th century. Its original derivation from Didacus is uncertain, among other things because the shift from -ía- to -ié- is unexplained (Becker 2009:386). The name Diego Gonzalez is given to a character in the Cantar de mio Cid, a 12th-century poem. It has been argued on metrical grounds that the name Diego in the Cantar represents an original Díago.

Medieval bearers of the name, such as Diego de Acebo (d. 1207), are recorded as Didacus in contemporary sources. Diego becomes the standard form of the name in the 14th century, and it is frequently given in the 16th century, e.g. Diego Laynez, 1512–1565. The city of San Diego was named for the flagship of Sebastián Vizcaíno (1602), which was itself named for Didacus of Alcalá (d. 1463).

== As a patronym ==
The patronym for Diego is Díaz in Castilian Spanish (used for example by Rodrigo Díaz de Vivar, better known as El Cid) and Dias in Portuguese. Like many patronymics, these have become common surnames among Spanish speakers worldwide. The form Diéguez is much less common; Diegues can be found in Lusophone countries. Diego and de Diego can also be found as surnames.

== As an ethnic term ==
"Diego" as a metonym for a Spaniard is documented from around 1615. The term "Dago" as a generic name for Spaniards is recorded in the 19th century and may possibly be a derivation from Diego. By the early 20th century, the term dago or dego was extended as an ethnic slur to Italian Americans in addition to people of Hispanic descent.

== See also ==
- Dhiego
- List of people with given name Diego
- Saint Diego (disambiguation)
