= San Diego (disambiguation) =

San Diego is a city in the U.S. state of California.

San Diego may also refer to:

== Geography ==
=== Colombia ===
- San Diego, Bogotá
- San Diego, Cesar, a town and municipality

=== Mexico ===
- San Diego de la Unión, a city in Guanajuato
- Fort of San Diego, a fort in Acapulco, Guerrero

=== Spain ===
- San Diego (Madrid), a neighborhood

=== United States ===
- San Diego, Texas
- San Diego County, California
  - San Diego Bay
  - San Diego River
- San Diego Creek, a creek in Orange County, California

=== Venezuela ===
- San Diego, Carabobo, an agricultural town
- San Diego Municipality, Carabobo

== Ships ==
- San Diego (ship), a colonial Philippines warship sunk in 1600
- USS San Diego, any of several ships of the US Navy
- San Diego, flagship of Sebastián Vizcaíno's 1602–1603 expedition to Alta California

== Sports ==
- San Diego Padres, a major league baseball team since 1969
- San Diego Padres (PCL), a minor league baseball team (1936-1968)
- San Diego Toreros, athletic teams of the University of San Diego
- San Diego Chargers, a former National Football League team that relocated to Los Angeles in 2017
- San Diego Gunners, a member of American Football League (1944)

== Education ==
- San Diego Unified School District
- University of San Diego (USD), a private Roman Catholic university
- University of California, San Diego (UCSD)

== Other uses ==
- Saint Diego (disambiguation), any of several people
- San Diego Freeway, a highway serving as the western bypass of Los Angeles
- San Diego Pro-cathedral, a Catholic church in the Philippines
- Mission San Diego de Alcalá, a Spanish mission in Alta California
- "San Diego", a 2016 song by Blink-182 from their album California
- San Diego, code name for an AMD Athlon 64 CPU version
- San Diego Hills, a cemetery in Indonesia
- San Diego, a fictional town in the Philippines in the novel Noli Me Tángere by José Rizal
- San Diego Magazine

== See also ==
- Carmen Sandiego, an educational media franchise
  - Carmen Sandiego (character), the title character of the franchise
- San Diegan (train)
- Diego (disambiguation)
- Santiago (disambiguation)
