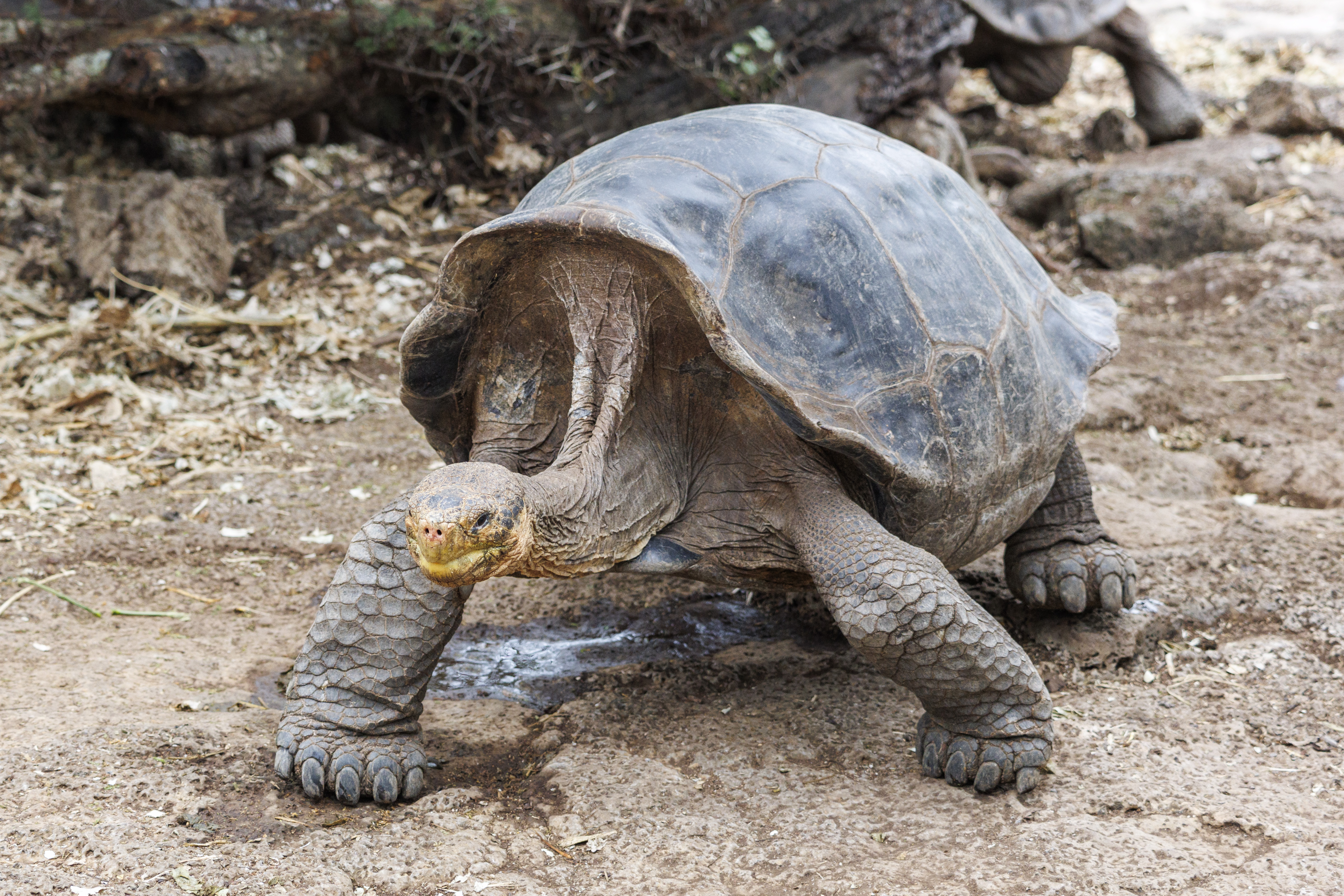

Conservation status
- Critically Endangered (IUCN 3.1)
- CITES Appendix I

Scientific classification
- Kingdom: Animalia
- Phylum: Chordata
- Class: Reptilia
- Order: Testudines
- Suborder: Cryptodira
- Family: Testudinidae
- Genus: Chelonoidis
- Species: C. niger
- Subspecies: C. n. hoodensis

Trinomial name
- Chelonoidis niger hoodensis (Van Denburgh, 1907)

Synonyms
- List: Testudo hoodensis Van Denburgh, 1907; Testudo elephantopus hoodensis Mertens & Wermuth, 1955; Geochelone elephantopus hoodensis Pritchard, 1967; Geochelone hoodensis Ernst & Barbour, 1989; Geochelone nigra hoodensis Iverson, 1992; Chelonoidis nigra hoodensis David, 1994; Chelonoidis hoodensis Rhodin et al., 2010; Chelonoidis niger hoodensis TTWG, 2021

= Hood Island giant tortoise =

Subspecies of turtle

The Hood Island giant tortoise (Chelonoidis niger hoodensis), also known commonly as the Española giant tortoise, is a subspecies (Note: Also commonly considered a species in its own right.) of Galápagos tortoise native to Española Island in the Galápagos.

== Taxonomy ==
The first description of the subspecies was published in 1907 by John Van Denburgh, who used the name Testudo hoodensis for it. Española Island used to be called Hood Island, and that was the name which Van Denburgh knew the island by when he gave the subspecies the name hoodensis. The holotype, a female, was caught by Joseph R. Slevin and E.S. King in June 1906 and brought back with them to San Francisco, where it was entered into the collection of the California Academy of Sciences and allowed to live in Golden Gate Park. The species has subsequently been moved between different genera and between being considered as a species in its own right or as a subspecies of Chelonoidis niger.

== Population history ==
This population was very heavily exploited by whalers in the 19th century and collapsed around 1850. 13 adults were found in the early 1970s and held at the Charles Darwin Research Station as a breeding colony. The two males and 11 females were initially brought to the Darwin Station. Fortuitously, a third male (Diego) was discovered at the San Diego Zoo and joined the others in a captive breeding program. Mating had not occurred naturally for some time, because the individuals were so scattered that they did not meet. Following the successful captive breeding program, large numbers have been released back into the wild and are now breeding on their own with the population reaching over 2,300 individuals as of August, 2020.

The massive decline in population led to the 1996 assessment of the subspecies for the IUCN Red List to deem it critically endangered. The most recent assessment in 2015 maintained the classification for the same reason.

== Description and behaviour ==
Chelonoidis niger hoodensis is the smallest subspecies of Galápagos tortoise, with its maximum length being about 75 cm (30 in); males generally being larger than females.

The carapace is black and shaped liked a saddle, with males being more saddlebacked than females. It is narrower towards the front of the tortoise, has a deep cervical indentation and a rim that is slightly serrated in the back. The plastron is similarly black, shorter than the carapace and narrow towards both ends of the tortoise.

The neck is long, ending with a small dark grey to black head, with white to yellowish pigmentation on the jaws, chin and throat, and with a nonprojecting snout. The rest of the turtle's skin is grey to black. The tail is short, and slightly thicker in males.

Individuals begin to reproduce at about 20 years of age, with mating taking place from December to August and followed by nesting period spanning late June to December. The estimated generation time is 60 years.

The tortoise is adapted to the dry shrubland habitat of Española Island and feeds on grass, cacti and other tall vegetation.

== Distribution and habitat ==
Chelonoidis niger hoodensis is native to Española Island, the southernmost of the Galápagos Islands of Ecuador, and used to be endemic to the island, but conservation efforts have since introduced a population of juveniles to the nearby Santa Fe Island, whose native tortoises are extinct.

Española island has an area of 60.5 km^{2} (23.4 sq mi), of which 10% is inhabited by the tortoise and another 40% is potentially capable of sustaining tortoise habitation. The tortoise mainly inhabits rocky, brushy areas of the island.

== Gallery ==
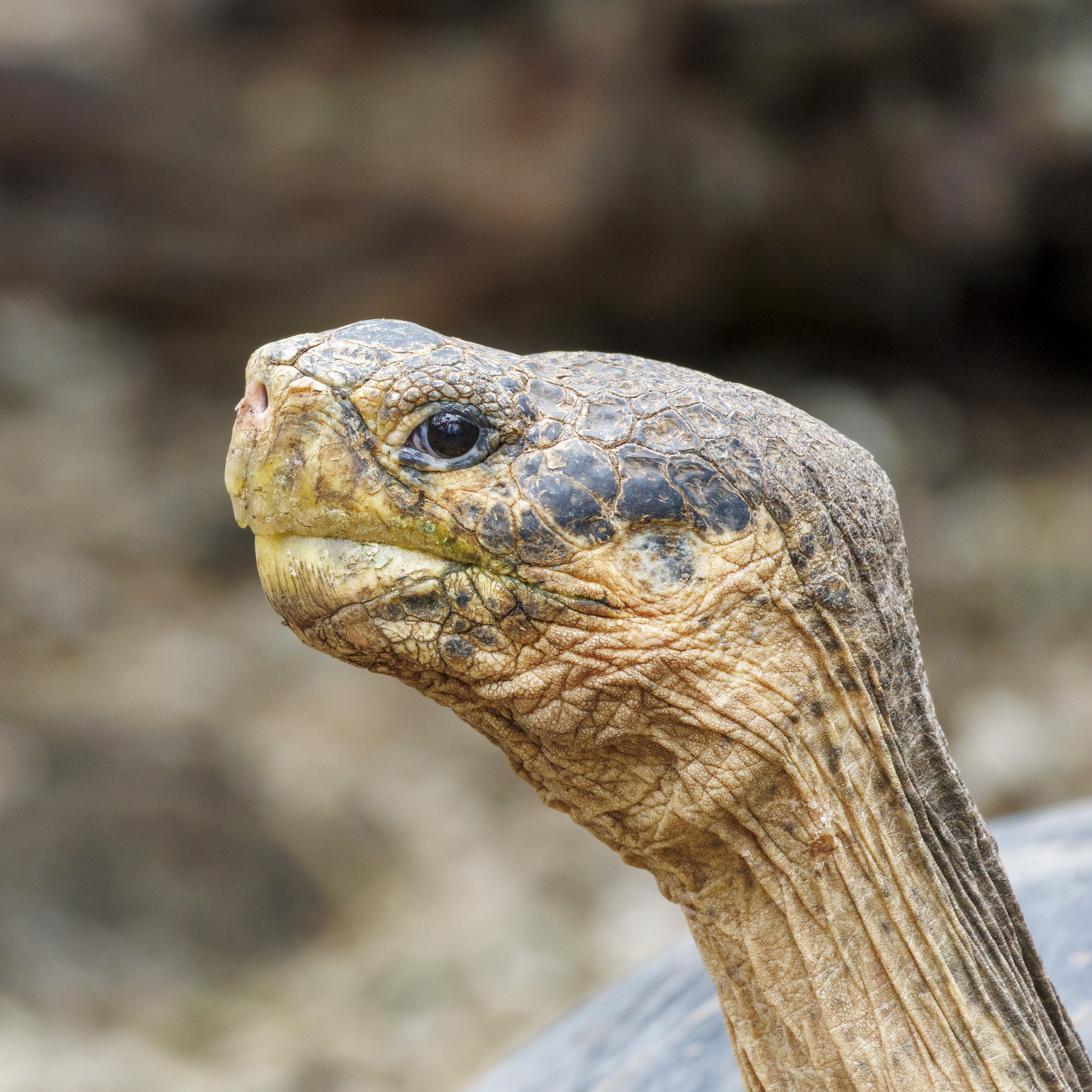
Close-up of head

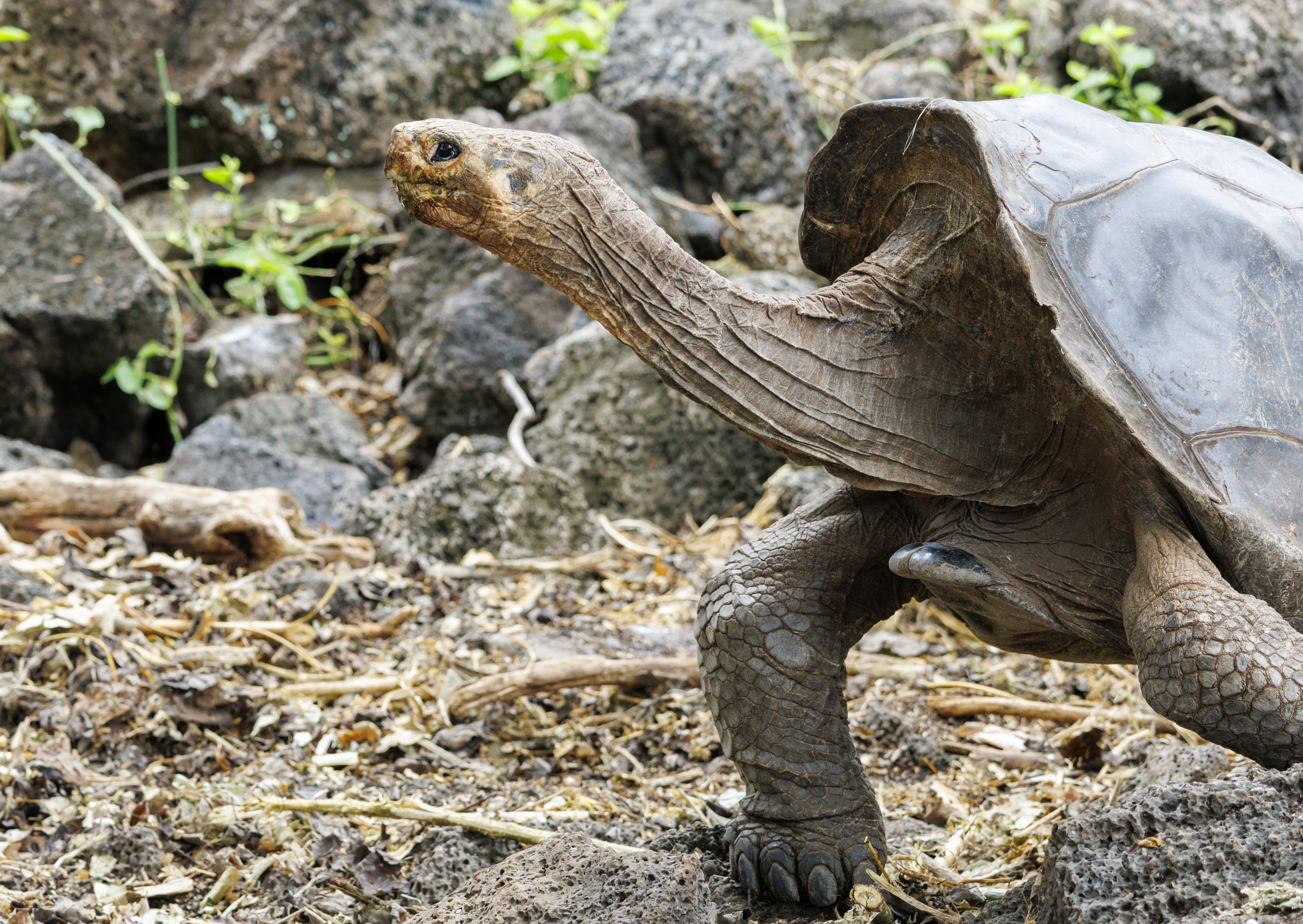
Profile of adult

== See also ==
- Diego (tortoise)
