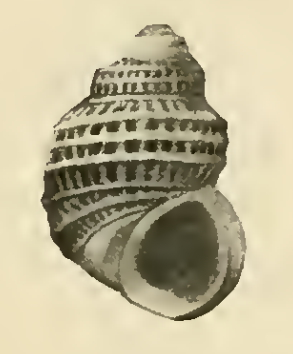
- Shell of Alvania tumida

Scientific classification
- Kingdom: Animalia
- Phylum: Mollusca
- Class: Gastropoda
- Subclass: Caenogastropoda
- Order: Littorinimorpha
- Superfamily: Rissooidea
- Family: Rissoidae
- Genus: Alvania
- Species: A. tumida

Binomial name
- Alvania tumida P. P. Carpenter, 1857

= Alvania tumida =

Species of gastropod

Alvania tumida is a species of small sea snail, a marine gastropod mollusk or micromollusk in the family Rissoidae.

== Taxonomy ==
This and other Western American species were attributed to Alvinia Monterosato, 1884, following Keen (1971); nevertheless it is not proved to be more related to the Mediterranean type species Alvania weinkauffi Weinkauff, 1868 than to other Alvania sensu lato and is therefore retained in Alvania.

== Description ==
The length of the shell attains 1.2 mm, its diameter 0.7 mm.

The minute, subglobose shell is chestnut brown excepting the columella and the edge of the outer lip, which are light yellow. The protoconch contains 1 1/3 well rounded whorls, very minutely papillose. The whorls of the teleoconch are inflated, slopingly shouldered at the summit, well rounded. They are ornamented with slender, almost vertical, axial riblets, of which 24 occur upon the first and 30 upon the penultimate whorl. In addition to the axial riblets, the whorls are marked by four spiral cords, of which the first, which is at the summit and is very feeble. The remaining three, which equal the axial ribs in strength, divide the space between the sutures into four equal parts. The spaces enclosed between the axial riblets and the spiral cords are squarish pits, while their junctions are very feebly, roundly tuberculate. The suture is moderately constricted. The periphery of the body whorl is marked by a slender spiral thread, equaling those between the sutures in strength. The space between it and the suprasutural cord is crossed by the continuations of the axial riblets. The base of the shell is narrowly umbilicated, well rounded, slightly inflated, marked by two spiral cords which equal the peripheral one. The spaces between the cords are about four times as wide as the cords and are crossed by the continuations of the axial riblets. The umbilical chink is bordered by a narrow tumid area. The aperture is subcircular. The outer lip is thick at the edge, re-enforced by a varix. The inner lip is decidedly curved, somewhat reflected over, and appressed to the base. The parietal wall is covered with a thick callus, which renders the peritreme complete.

== Distribution ==
This species occurs off the Española Island, Galapagos Islands and California, USA.
