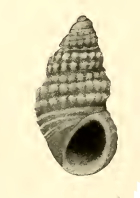
- Shell of Alvania ima (holotype)

Scientific classification
- Kingdom: Animalia
- Phylum: Mollusca
- Class: Gastropoda
- Subclass: Caenogastropoda
- Order: Littorinimorpha
- Superfamily: Rissooidea
- Family: Rissoidae
- Genus: Alvania
- Species: A. ima

Binomial name
- Alvania ima Bartsch, 1911

Synonyms
- Alvinia ima (Bartsch, 1911) ·

= Alvania ima =

Species of gastropod

Alvania ima is a species of small sea snail, a marine gastropod mollusk or micromollusk in the family Rissoidae.

== Description ==
The length of the shell attains 2 mm, its diameter 1.2 mm.

(Original descxription) The elongate-ovate shell is white excepting a broad, yellow band which encircles the periphery and shows above the suture on all the whorls. There are at least two smooth whorls in the protoconch. The whorls of the teleoconch are narrowly, slopingly shouldered at the summit. They are marked by strong, protractive, axial ribs, of which 14 occur upon the first, 18 upon the second, and 20 upon the penultimate whorl. In addition to the axial ribs, the whorls are marked between the sutures by three spiral cords, of which the first — which is quite slender —is at the summit.The second, which is very broad, is double the width of the next and is on the middle of the whorl. While the third, which is a little stronger than the first, forms the posterior border of the deeply channeled suture. The space separating the first cord from the median one is about as wide as the median cord, while that which separates the median from the third is equal to the third cord. The intersections of the axial ribs and spiral cords form tubercles which are small and rounded on the first cord. On the second they are truncated posteriorly, sloping gently anteriorly, somewhat flattened and enlarged. On the third they are somewhat flattened, truncated posteriorly and gently rounded anteriorly. The weak cord at the summit and the broad space immediately below it give to the whorls a constricted appearance at this point. The periphery of the body whorl is marked by a deep sulcus across which the axial ribs do not extend. The base of the shell is well rounded, produced anteriorly, and marked by five spiral cords, which grow successively weaker from the periphery to the columella. The aperture is very oblique. The posterior angle is obtuse. The outer lip is thin at the edge, reenforced immediately behind the edge by a strong varix. The inner lip is stout, strongly curved, and reflected over, and appressed to the base.

== Distribution ==
This species is endemic to and occurs off the Española Island, Galapagos Islands
