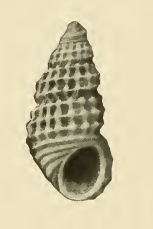
- Shell of Alvania halia (holotype)

Scientific classification
- Kingdom: Animalia
- Phylum: Mollusca
- Class: Gastropoda
- Subclass: Caenogastropoda
- Order: Littorinimorpha
- Superfamily: Rissooidea
- Family: Rissoidae
- Genus: Alvania
- Species: A. halia

Binomial name
- Alvania halia Bartsch, 1911

Synonyms
- Alvinia halia (Bartsch, 1911) ·

= Alvania halia =

Species of gastropod

Alvania halia is a species of small sea snail, a marine gastropod mollusk or micromollusk in the family Rissoidae.

== Taxonomy ==
This and other Western American species were attributed to Alvinia Monterosato, 1884, following Keen (1971); nevertheless it is not proved to be more related to the Mediterranean type species Alvania weinkauffi Weinkauff, 1868 than to other Alvania s.l. and is therefore retained in Alvania.

== Description ==
The length of the shell attains 2.4 mm, its diameter 1.1 mm.

(Original description) The white shell is elongate-conic. The 1½ whorls of the protoconch are well rounded, apparently with several spiral lirations, which are ill-defined on the somewhat eroded surface of the specimens. The whorls of the teleoconch are shouldered at the summit. They are ornamented by strong, axial ribs, of which 14 occur upon the second, 16 upon the third, and 20 upon the penultimate whorl. These ribs extend strongly from the summit of the whorls to the suture. In addition to the axial ribs, the whorls are marked by three spiral cords which are about half as wide as the spaces that separate them. The first of these cords is at the angle of the shoulder near the summit, the second on the middle of the whorl, while the third is immediately above the deeply channeled suture. The intersections of the axial ribs and spiral cords form strong tubercles, while the spaces enclosed between them are deeply impressed, squarish pits. The periphery of the body whorl is marked by a sulcus which is almost as wide as that separating the supra-peripheral from the median cord and, like it, is crossed by the continuations of the axial ribs. The base of the shell is attenuated anteriorly, marked by five strong, spiral cords which are almost equal. The spaces separating these cords are a little narrower than the cords and are crossed by axial lines of growth. The ovate aperture is very oblique. The posterior angle is obtuse. The outer lip is very much thickened by an external varix. The inner lip is very stout, very strongly curved, reflected over, and appressed to the base. The parietal wall is covered with a thick callus which renders the perifreme complete.

== Distribution ==
This species is endemic to and occurs off the Española Island, Galapagos Islands
