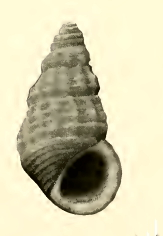
- Shell of Alvania nemo (holotype)

Scientific classification
- Kingdom: Animalia
- Phylum: Mollusca
- Class: Gastropoda
- Subclass: Caenogastropoda
- Order: Littorinimorpha
- Superfamily: Rissooidea
- Family: Rissoidae
- Genus: Alvania
- Species: A. nemo

Binomial name
- Alvania nemo Bartsch, 1911

= Alvania nemo =

Species of gastropod

Alvania nemo is a species of small sea snail, a marine gastropod mollusk or micromollusk in the family Rissoidae.

== Description ==
The length of the shell attains 2.6 mm, its diameter 1.2 mm.

(Original description) The white shell is ovate. There are 2½ protoconch whorls. They are marked by two very strong, spiral keels which are separated by a sulcus as broad as the keels. The teleoconch whorls are well rounded, marked by low, rounded, slightly retractive, axial ribs, 14 of which occur upon all the whorls. In addition to the axial sculpture, the whorls are marked by a low, poorly developed, rounded, spiral cord at the summit, and two considerably stronger cords — separated by a narrow channel — a little anterior to the middle of the whorl. On the penultimate whorl a slender, spiral cord appears, halfway between the one at the summit and the first one below it. The spaces inclosed between the spiral cords and axial ribs are squarish pits at the summit on all the whorls except the penultimate and body whorl, where an intercalated spiral cord renders them oblong. The spaces between the two strong, spiral cords and the axial ribs are very long, narrow pits, having their long axes parallel to the spiral sculpture, while the spaces inclosed between the last spiral cord, the suture, and the axial ribs are also squarish in form. The suture is moderately constricted. The periphery of the body whorl is marked by a broad sulcus, which is bounded anteriorly by a strong spiral cord. This sulcus is crossed by the continuations of the axial ribs which terminate at the posterior edge of the basal spiral cord. The base of the shell is produced anteriorly and is very slightly rounded. It is marked by eight low, poorly developed, flattened spiral cords, of which the one immediately below the periphery is the strongest. The aperture is broadly oval. The posterior angle is obtuse. The outer lip is very thick, re-enforced immediately behind the edge by a strong varix. The inner lip is very oblique, curved, reflected over, and appressed to the base. The parietal wall is covered with a thick callus, rendering the peristome complete.

== Distribution ==
This species is endemic to and occurs off the Española Island, Galapagos Islands
