= Economy of San Diego =

The economy of San Diego is the 17th largest among metro areas in the United States and 4th largest among California's metro areas, with a gross domestic product in Greater San Diego of $206 billion in 2014. The economy is also part of the San Diego–Tijuana international metropolitan area. The largest sectors of San Diego's economy are defense/military, tourism, international trade, and research/manufacturing. In 2014, San Diego was designated by a Forbes columnist as the best city in the country to launch a small business or startup company.

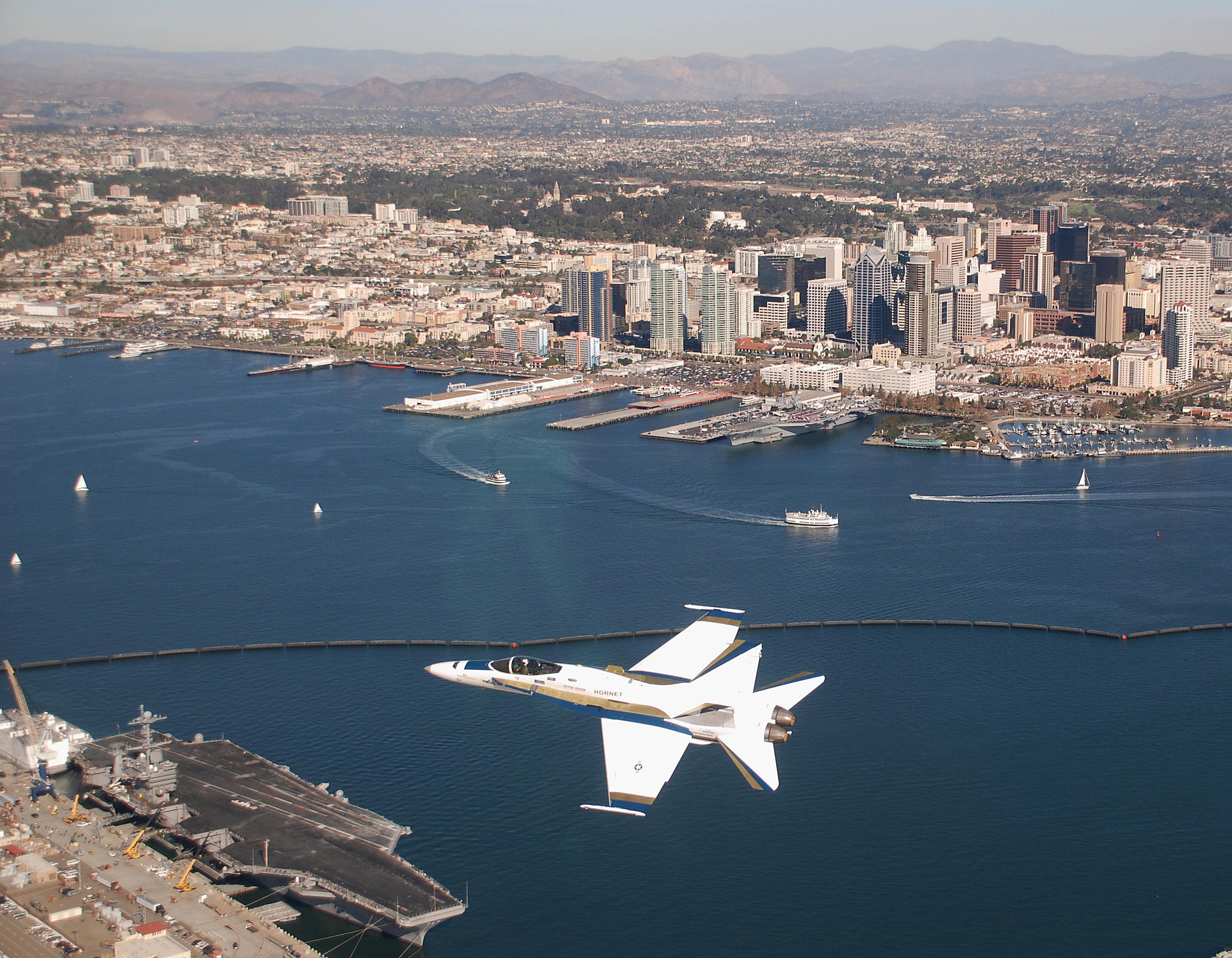
F/A-18 Hornet flying over San Diego and USS John C. Stennis.

== Defense and military ==
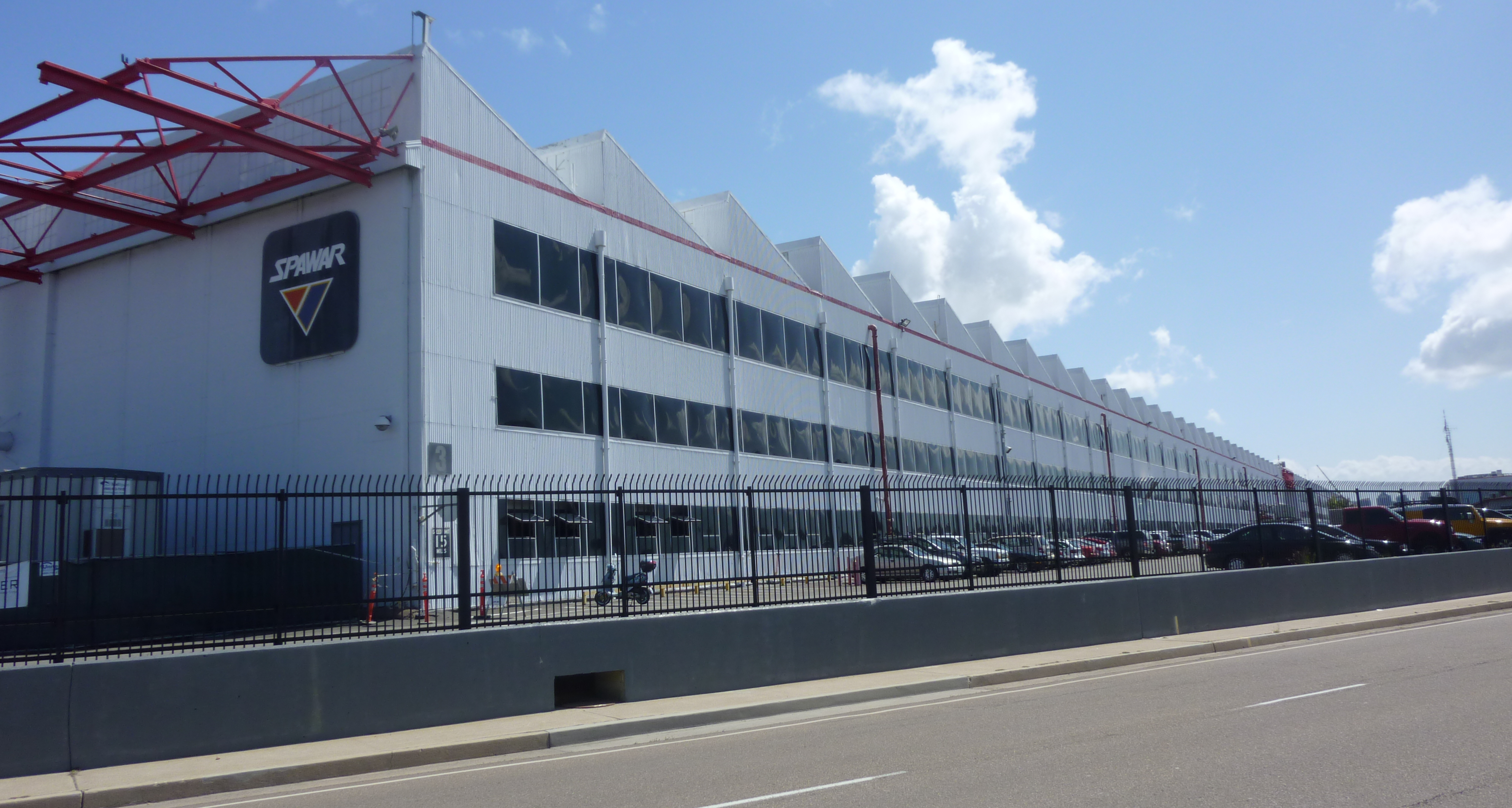
Naval Information Warfare Systems Command (NAVWAR)

The economy of San Diego is influenced by its deepwater port, which includes the only major submarine and shipbuilding yards on the West Coast. Several major national defense contractors were started and are headquartered in San Diego, including General Atomics, Cubic, and NASSCO.

San Diego hosts the largest naval fleet in the world: In 2008 it was home to 53 ships, over 120 tenant commands, and more than 35,000 sailors, soldiers, Department of Defense civilian employees and contractors. San Diego is home to the California National Guard's 79th Infantry Brigade Combat team. About 5 percent of all civilian jobs in the county are military-related, and 15,000 businesses in San Diego County rely on Department of Defense contracts.

Military bases in San Diego include US Navy facilities, Marine Corps bases, and Coast Guard stations. Marine Corps institutions in the city of San Diego include Marine Corps Air Station Miramar and Marine Corps Recruit Depot San Diego. The Navy has several institutions in the city, including Naval Base Point Loma, Naval Base San Diego, Naval Medical Center San Diego, the Naval Information Warfare Center Pacific, and the Naval Information Warfare Systems Command. Also near San Diego but not within the city limits are Naval Amphibious Base Coronado and Naval Air Station North Island (which operates Naval Auxiliary Landing Facility San Clemente Island, Silver Strand Training Complex, and Naval Outlying Landing Field Imperial Beach). San Diego is known as the "birthplace of naval aviation".

The city is "home to the majority of the U.S. Pacific Fleet's surface combatants, all of the Navy's West Coast amphibious ships and a variety of Coast Guard and Military Sealift Command vessels". Two Nimitz-class supercarriers, (USS Carl Vinson, and USS Ronald Reagan), five amphibious assault ships, several Los Angeles-class "fast" attack submarines, the hospital ship USNS Mercy, carrier and submarine tenders, destroyers, cruisers, frigates, and many smaller ships are home-ported there. Four Navy vessels have been named USS San Diego.

== Tourism ==
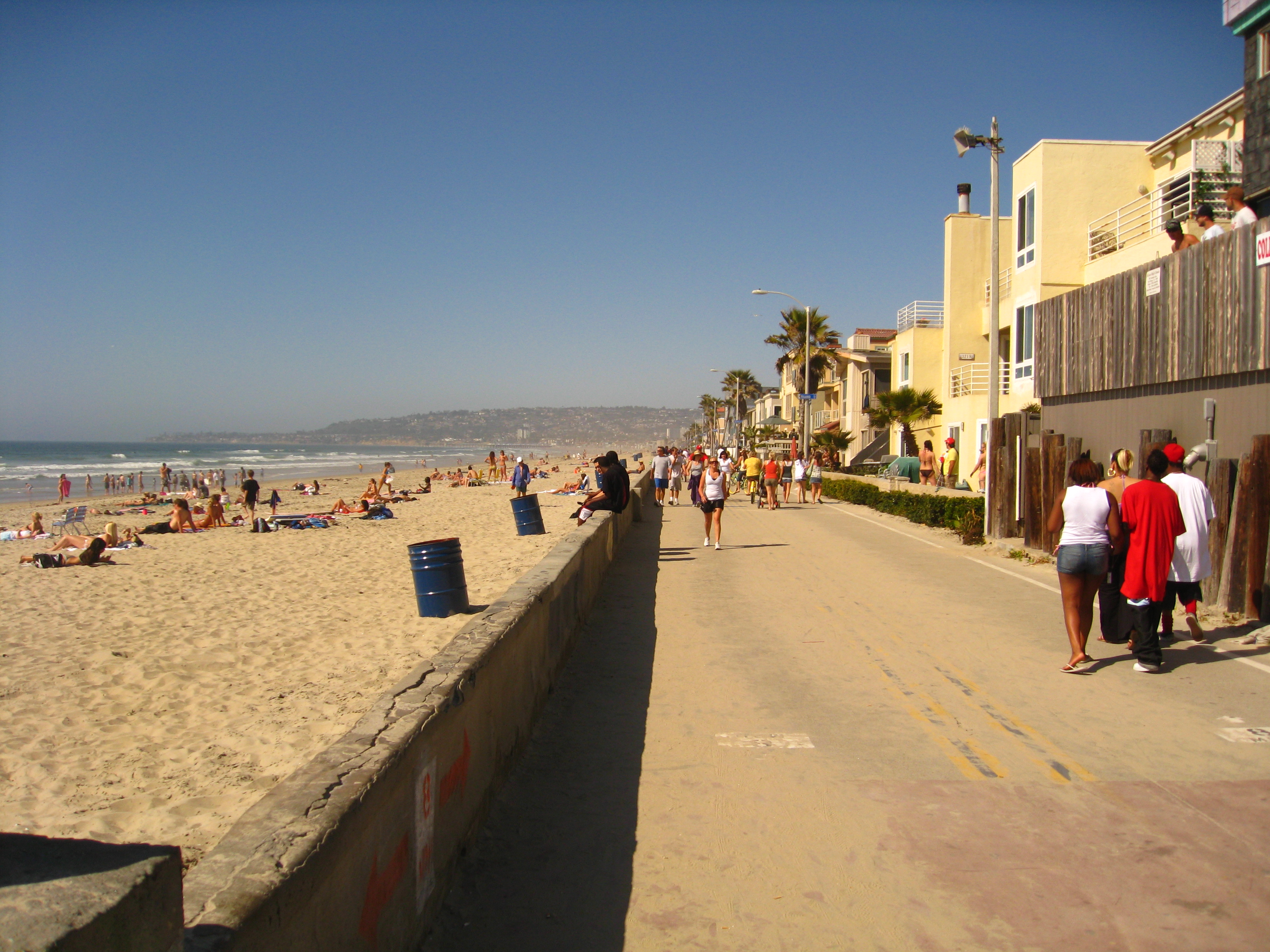
Mission Beach

Tourism is a major industry owing to the city's climate, its beaches, and numerous tourist attractions such as Balboa Park, Belmont Park, San Diego Zoo, San Diego Zoo Safari Park, and SeaWorld San Diego. San Diego's Spanish and Mexican heritage is reflected in the many historic sites across the city, such as Mission San Diego de Alcala and Old Town San Diego State Historic Park. Annual events include San Diego Comic-Con, The Sentry golf tournament and San Diego Pride. Also, the local craft brewing industry attracts an increasing number of visitors for "beer tours" and the annual San Diego Beer Week in November; San Diego has been called "America's Craft Beer Capital" by San Diego–based author Bruce Glassman.

San Diego County hosted more than 32 million visitors in 2012, of whom approximately half stayed overnight and half were day visitors; collectively they spent an estimated $8 billion locally, with a regional economic impact of more than $18 billion. The visitor industry provides employment for more than 160,000 people. The San Diego Convention Center hosted 68 out-of-town conventions and trade shows in 2009, attracting more than 600,000 visitors. Transient Occupancy Taxes (TOT) have created funding for the City of San Diego Commission for Arts and Culture.

San Diego's cruise ship industry used to be the second-largest in California. Each cruise ship call injects an estimated $2 million (from the purchase of food, fuel, supplies, and maintenance services, not counting the money spent by the tourists) into the local economy. Numerous cruise lines, including Carnival, Holland America, Celebrity, Crystal and Princess, operate out of San Diego. However, cruise ship business has been in steady decline since peaking in 2008, when the Port hosted over 250 ship calls and more than 900,000 passengers. By 2011 the number of ship calls had fallen to 103 (estimated). Holland America and Carnival Cruises operated weekly cruises to the Mexican Riviera for many years, but both ended their regular scheduled service in spring 2012, which was an economic loss to the region of more than $100 million. The decline is blamed on the slumping economy as well as fear of travel to Mexico due to well-publicized violence there.

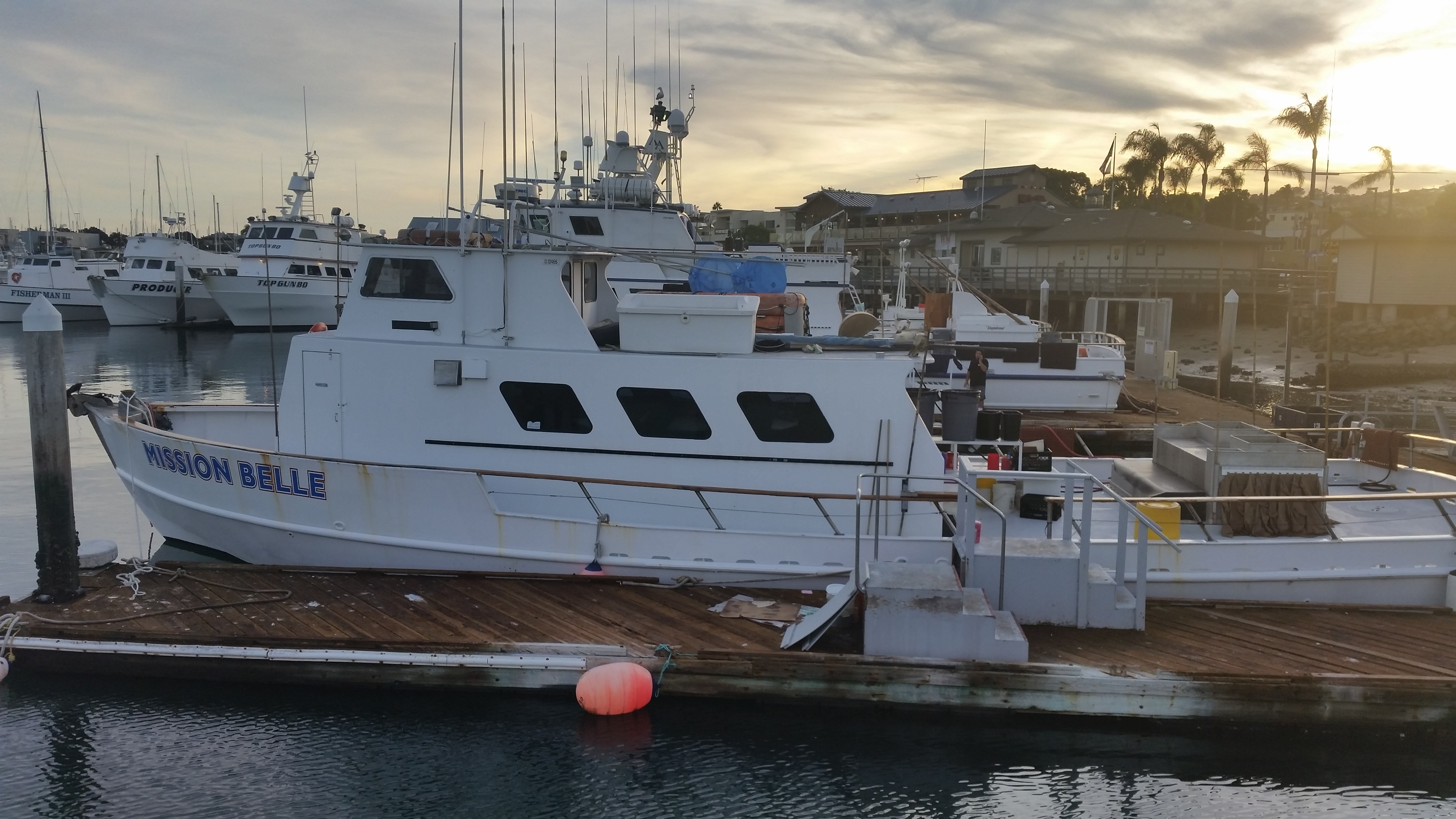
Fisherman's Landing in Point Loma.

There are local cruises in San Diego Bay and Mission Bay, available through companies such as Hornblower and H&M. These include sightseeing and "sunset" cruises as well as private-event or "party" cruises. Also available are whale watching cruises to observe the migration of tens of thousands of gray whales that pass by San Diego, peaking in mid-January, and year-round sport fishing expeditions.

== International trade ==
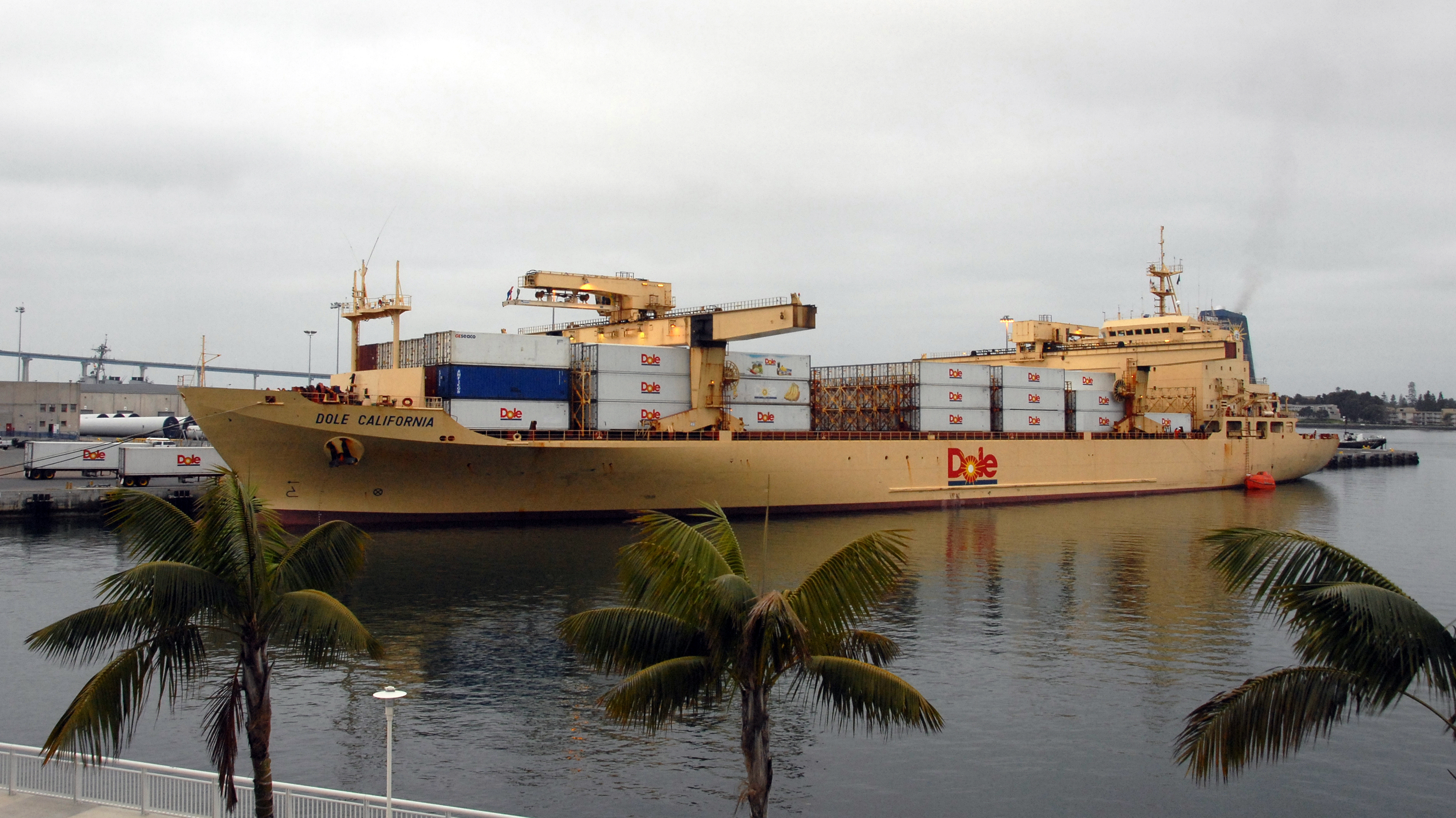
Dole bananas from Honduras being offloaded in the Port of San Diego

San Diego's commercial port and its location on the Mexico–United States border make international trade an important factor in the city's economy. The city is authorized by the United States government to operate as a foreign-trade zone.

The city shares a 15-mile (24 km) border with Mexico that includes two border crossings. San Diego hosts the busiest international border crossing in the world, in the San Ysidro neighborhood at the San Ysidro Port of Entry. A second, primarily commercial border crossing operates in the Otay Mesa area; it is the largest commercial crossing on the California-Baja California border and handles the third-highest volume of trucks and dollar value of trade among all United States-Mexico land crossings.

One of the Port of San Diego's two cargo facilities is located in downtown San Diego at the Tenth Avenue Marine Terminal. This terminal has facilities for containers, bulk cargo, and refrigerated and frozen storage, so that it can handle the import and export of perishables (including 33 million bananas every month) as well as fertilizer, cement, forest products, and other commodities. In 2009 the Port of San Diego handled 1,137,054 short tons of total trade; foreign trade accounted for 956,637 short tons while domestic trade amounted to 180,417 short tons.

== Technology ==
San Diego hosts several major producers of wireless cellular technology. Qualcomm was founded and is headquartered in San Diego, and still is the largest private-sector technology employer (excluding hospitals) in San Diego County. Other wireless industry manufacturers headquartered here include Nokia, LG Electronics, Kyocera International., Cricket Communications and Novatel Wireless. According to the San Diego Business Journal, the largest software company in San Diego is security software company Websense Inc. San Diego also has the U.S. headquarters for the Slovak security company ESET.

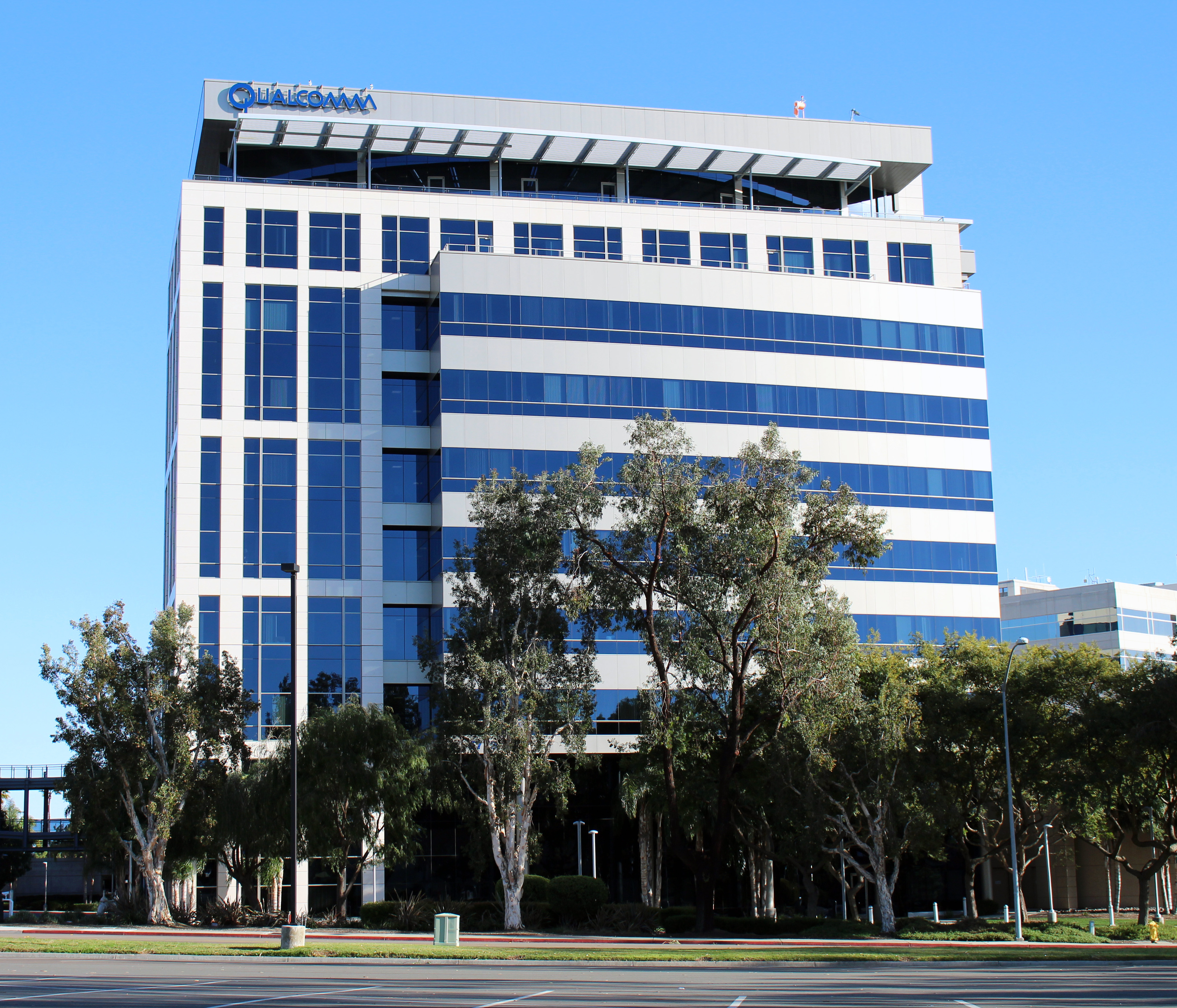
Qualcomm corporate headquarters

In 2010, former Governor Arnold Schwarzenegger's Office of Economic Development designated San Diego as an iHub Innovation Center for collaboration potentially between wireless and life sciences, citing the area's wireless business, pharmaceutical research and start-ups for medical devices and diagnostics.

According to the Center for American Entrepreneurship, San Diego was among the top ten cities for technology in 2016–2017, based on the number of local deals.

== Life sciences ==
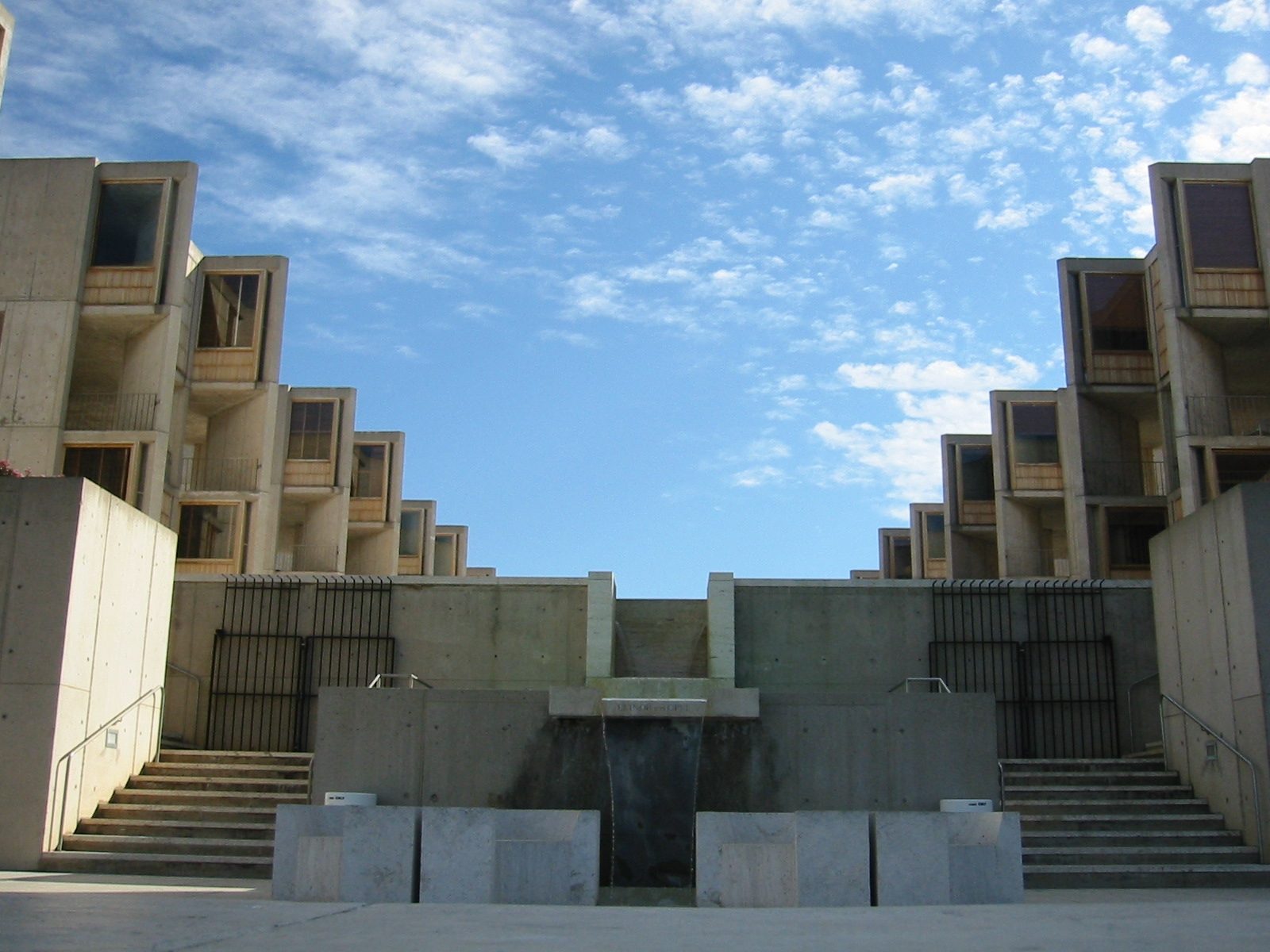
Salk Institute for Biological Studies

The presence of the University of California, San Diego, Scripps Research, Sanford Burnham Prebys Medical Discovery Institute, the Salk Institute for Biological Studies, and other world-renowned research institutions has helped fuel the region's biopharmaceutical and medical device growth. Combined, these academic centers were awarded $800 million in NIH grants in 2016. That year, the San Diego life sciences industry employed 45,949 people, many of whom are clustered around the La Jolla and nearby Sorrento Valley areas, which are home to offices and research facilities for numerous biotechnology companies. Major biotechnology companies like Neurocrine Biosciences and Illumina are headquartered in San Diego, while many biotech and pharmaceutical companies, such as BD Biosciences, Biogen Idec, Integrated DNA Technologies, Merck, Pfizer, Élan, Celgene, and Vertex, have offices or research facilities in San Diego. San Diego is also home to more than 140 contract research organizations (CROs) that provide a variety of contract services for pharmaceutical and biotechnology companies.

== Real estate ==
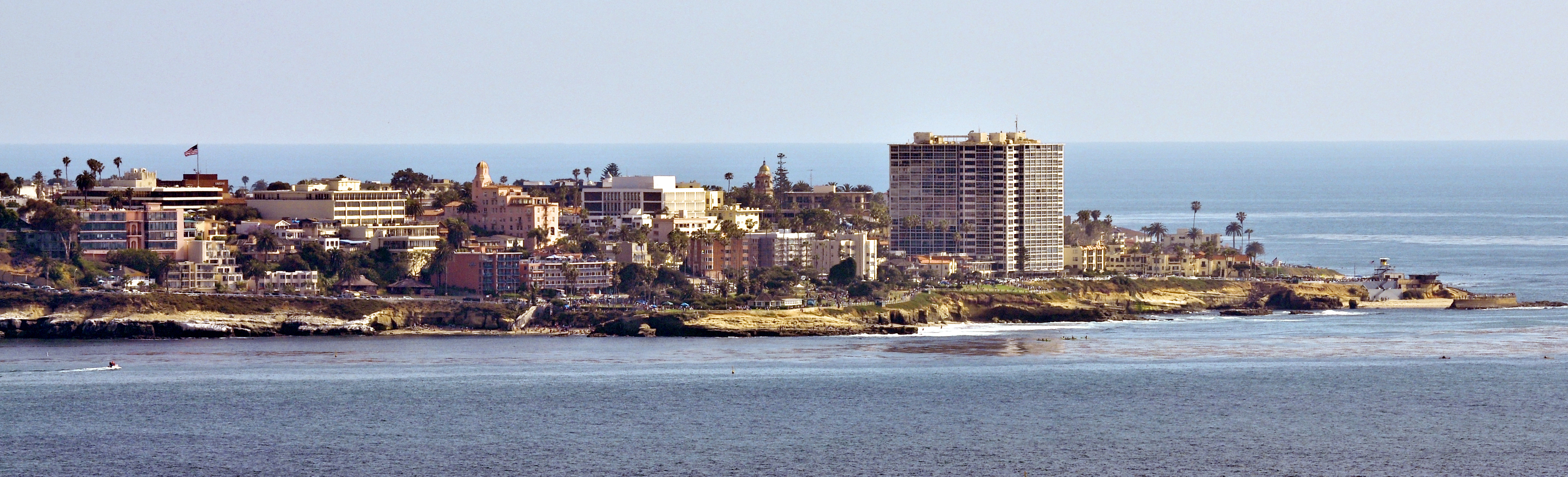
Skyline view of the Village of La Jolla in San Diego

Prior to 2006, San Diego experienced a dramatic growth of real estate prices, to the extent that the situation was sometimes described as a "housing affordability crisis". Median single family home prices more than tripled between 1998 and 2007. According to the California Association of Realtors, in May 2007 a median house in San Diego cost $612,370. Growth of real estate prices was not accompanied by comparable growth of household incomes: the housing affordability index (percentage of households that can afford to buy a median-priced house) fell below 20 percent in the early 2000s. The San Diego metropolitan area had one of the worst median multiples (ratio of median house price to median household income) of all metropolitan areas in the United States, a situation sometimes referred to as a sunshine tax. As a consequence, San Diego has experienced negative net migration since 2004. A significant number of people moved to adjacent Riverside County, commuting daily from Temecula and Murrieta to jobs in San Diego. Many of San Diego's home buyers tend to buy homes within the more affordable neighborhoods, while others are leaving the state altogether and moving to more affordable regions of the country.

San Diego home prices peaked in 2005, then declined as part of a nationwide trend. As of December 2010, home prices were 60 percent higher than in 2000, but down 36 percent from the peak in 2005. The median home price declined by more than $200,000 between 2005 and 2010, and sales dropped by 50 percent.

== Top employers ==
According to the city's 2017 Comprehensive Annual Financial Report, the top employers in the city are:

The United States Navy is San Diego's largest employer.

Employer	Number of employees
Naval Base San Diego	34,185
University of California, San Diego	30,130
San Diego County	19,131
Sharp HealthCare	17,976
San Diego Unified School District	13,815
Qualcomm	11,830
Scripps Health	11,807
City of San Diego	11,454
Kaiser Permanente	9,066
San Diego Community College District	6,564

Historically tuna fishing and canning was one of San Diego's major industries, and although the American tuna fishing fleet is no longer based in San Diego, seafood company Bumble Bee Foods is still headquartered there.

== See also ==
- Companies based in San Diego
- San Diego Climate Action Plan
