= Epigonus (disambiguation) =

Epigonus is the Latinized form of epigonos (Greek: ἐπίγονος, "progeny"). It can refer to:

== Personal name ==
- Epigonos, pseudonym of Karl Adolph Gjellerup
- Epigonos of Telmessos, second son of Ptolemy I Epigone
- Antipater Epigonos, son of Epigonos of Telmessus
- Ptolemy Epigonos, co-regent of Egypt with Ptolemy II
- Epigonus, sculptor of the Pergamene school
- Epigonus of Ambracia, 6th century BC Greek musician
  - Epigonion, a musical instrument invented by Epigonus of Ambracia
- Epigonus of Thessalonica, author of two epigrams in the Greek Anthology

== Greek mythology ==
- Epigoni Sons of the failed Seven against Thebes.

== Scientific name ==
- Vexillum epigonus, species of small sea snail
- Epigonus (fish), genus of cardinalfishes
