= Dhiego =

Dhiego is a rare variant of the popular given name Diego. Notable people with the name include:

- Dhiego Lima (born 1989), Brazilian mixed martial artist
- Dhiego Martins (born 1988), Brazilian footballer
