= Diego (store) =

- Company type: Private
- Industry: Retail
- Founded: 1992; 34 years ago
- Headquarters: Dabas, Hungary
- Number of locations: 166 (2023)
- Area served: Hungary, Romania, Slovakia
- Products: Interior design
- Website: www.diego.hu

Diego (stylized DIEGO) is a Hungarian store chain that sells mainly laminated floors, PVC tiles, carpets, curtains, draperies and wallpapers. The company was founded in 1992 and as of October 2023 has a network of 116 stores in Hungary, 33 stores Romania and 17 stores in Slovakia.
