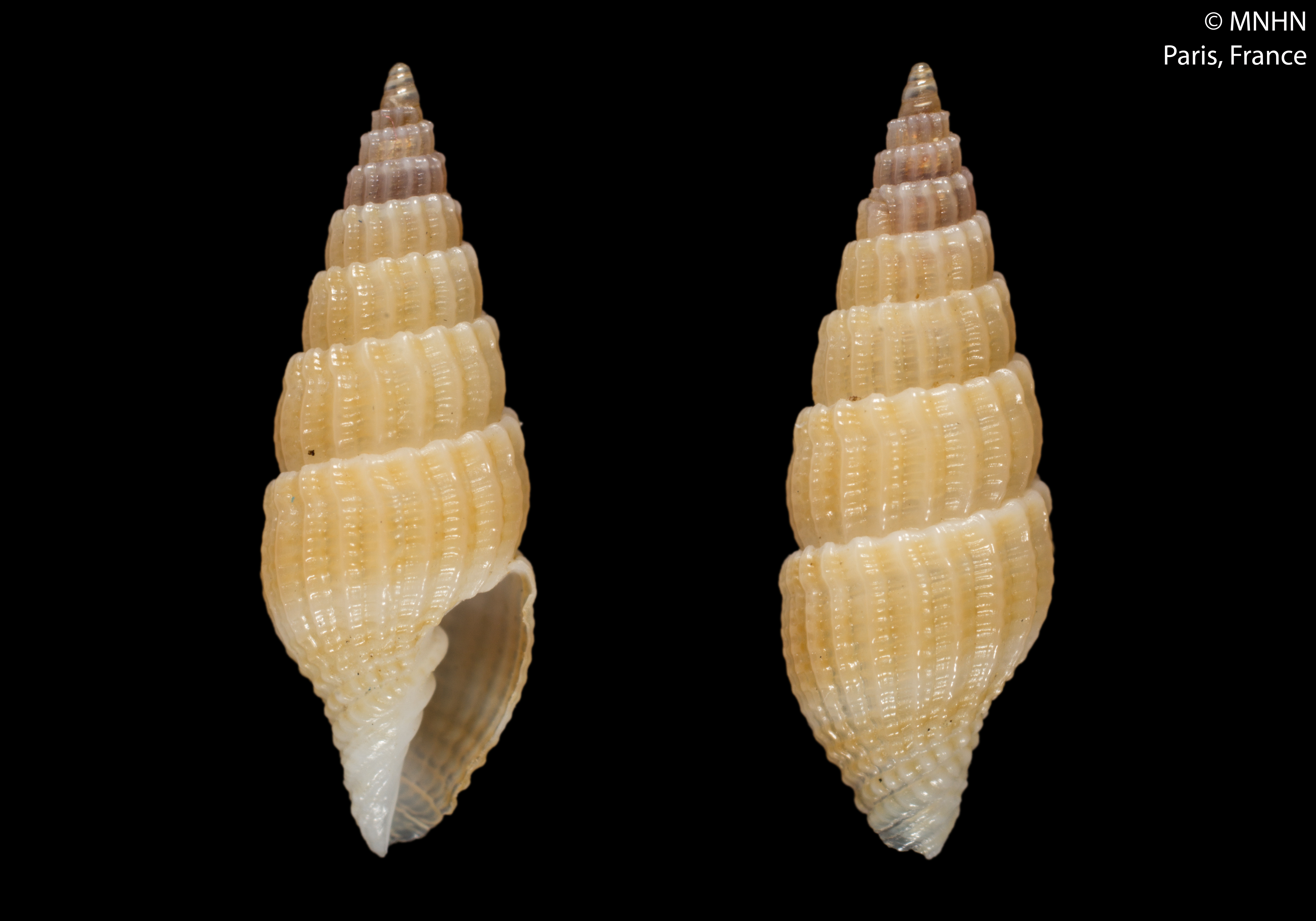
- Shell of Vexillum epigonus (holotype at MNHN, Paris)

Scientific classification
- Kingdom: Animalia
- Phylum: Mollusca
- Class: Gastropoda
- Subclass: Caenogastropoda
- Order: Neogastropoda
- Family: Costellariidae
- Genus: Vexillum
- Species: V. epigonus

Binomial name
- Vexillum epigonus Salisbury & Guillot de Suduiraut, 2006

Synonyms
- Vexillum (Costellaria) epigonus R. Salisbury & E. Guillot de Suduiraut, 2006

= Vexillum epigonus =

Species of gastropod

Vexillum epigonus is a species of small sea snail, marine gastropod mollusk in the family Costellariidae, the ribbed miters.

== Description ==
The length of the shell attains 16 mm.

== Distribution ==
This marine species occurs off the Philippines and in the East China Sea.
