= Diego (tortoise) =

Famous tortoise for being father of around 900 hatchlings

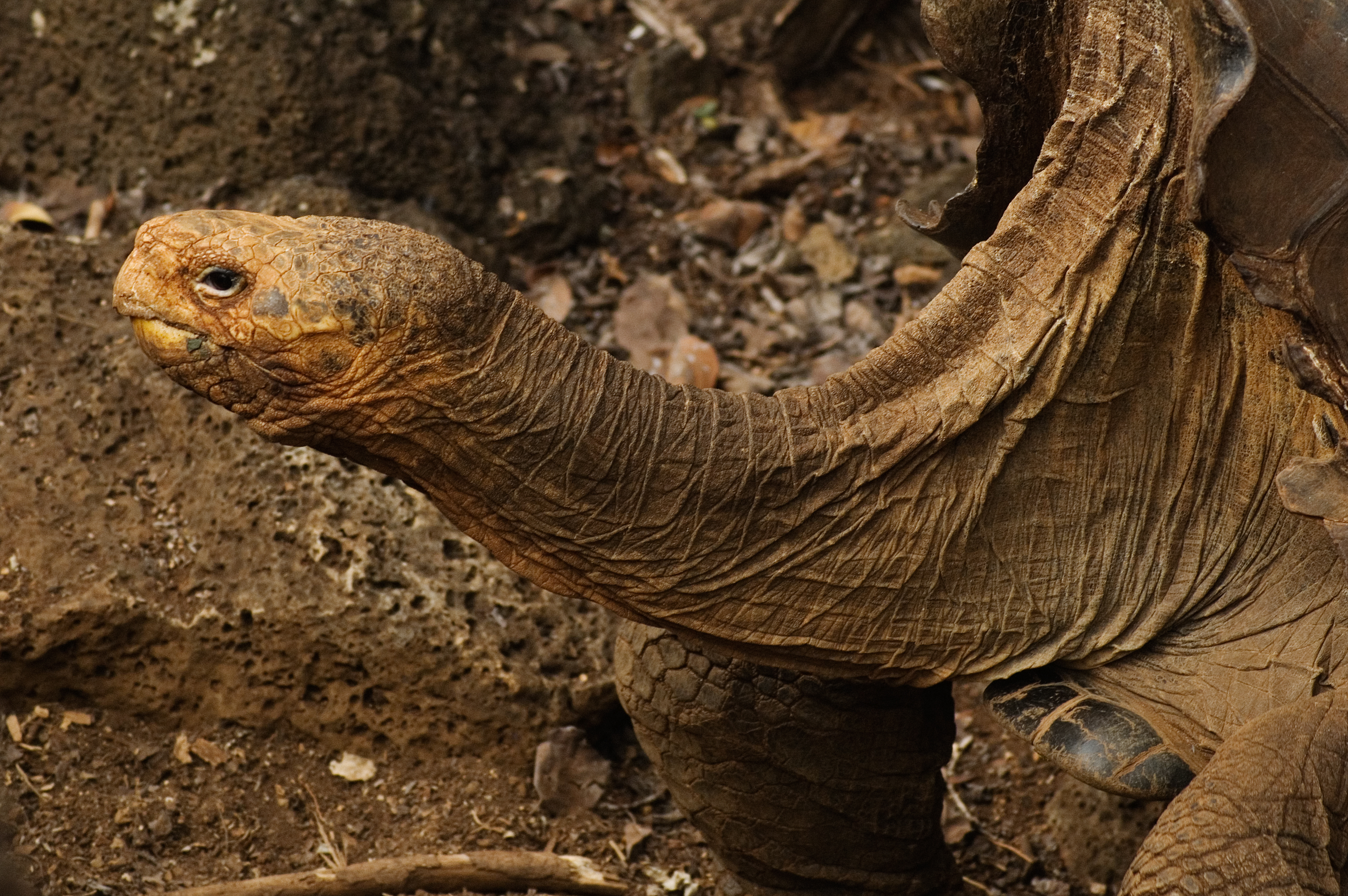
- Diego photographed in 2009
- Species: Hood Island giant tortoise (Chelonoidis niger hoodensis)
- Sex: Male
- Hatched: 1910s Española Island, Ecuador
- Nationality: Galápagos, Ecuador
- Known for: participation in tortoise breeding program
- Offspring: Around 900
- Weight: 80 kg (176 lb)
- Height: 90 cm (35 in)
- Named after: San Diego Zoo

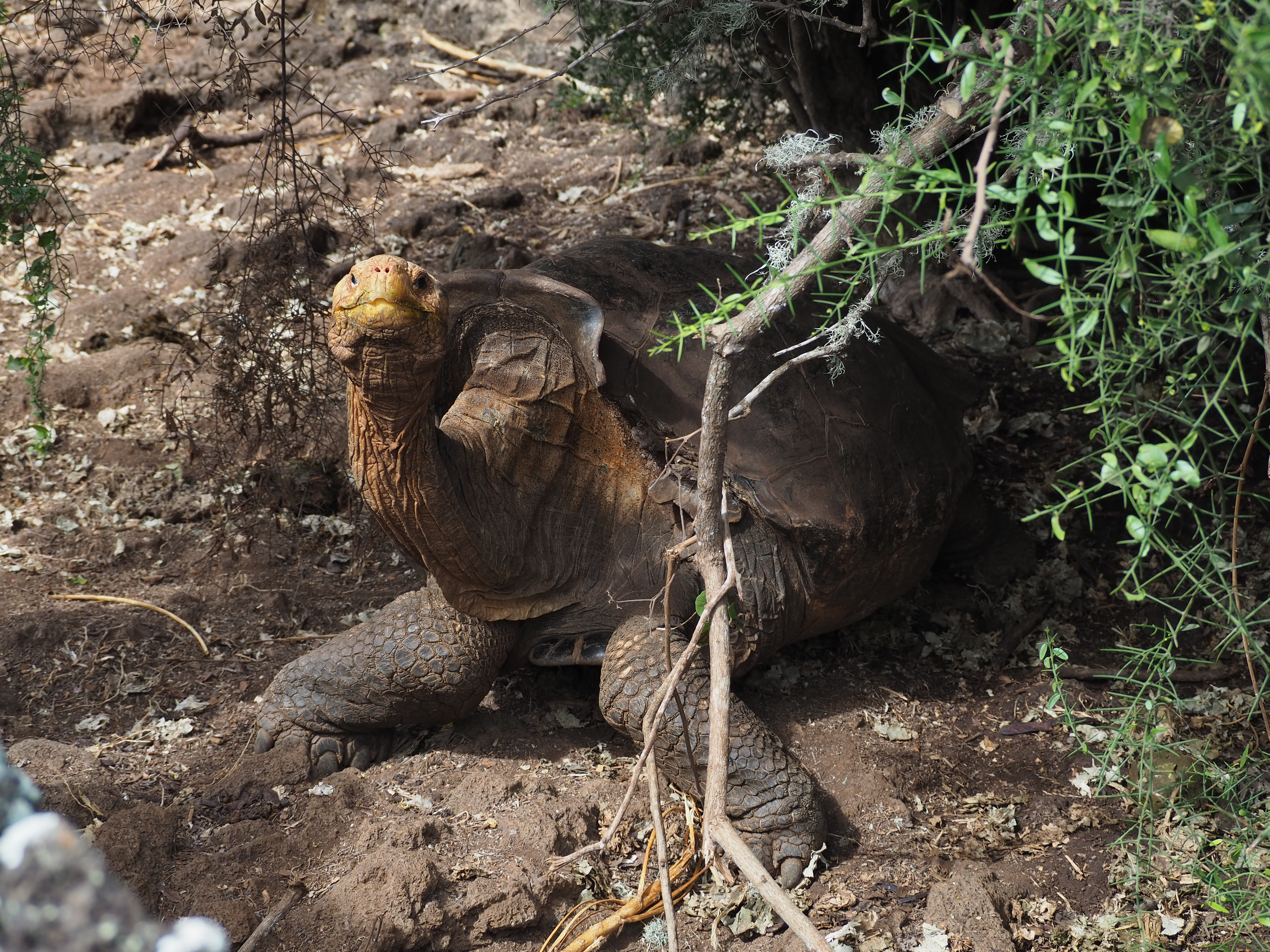
Diego in 2019

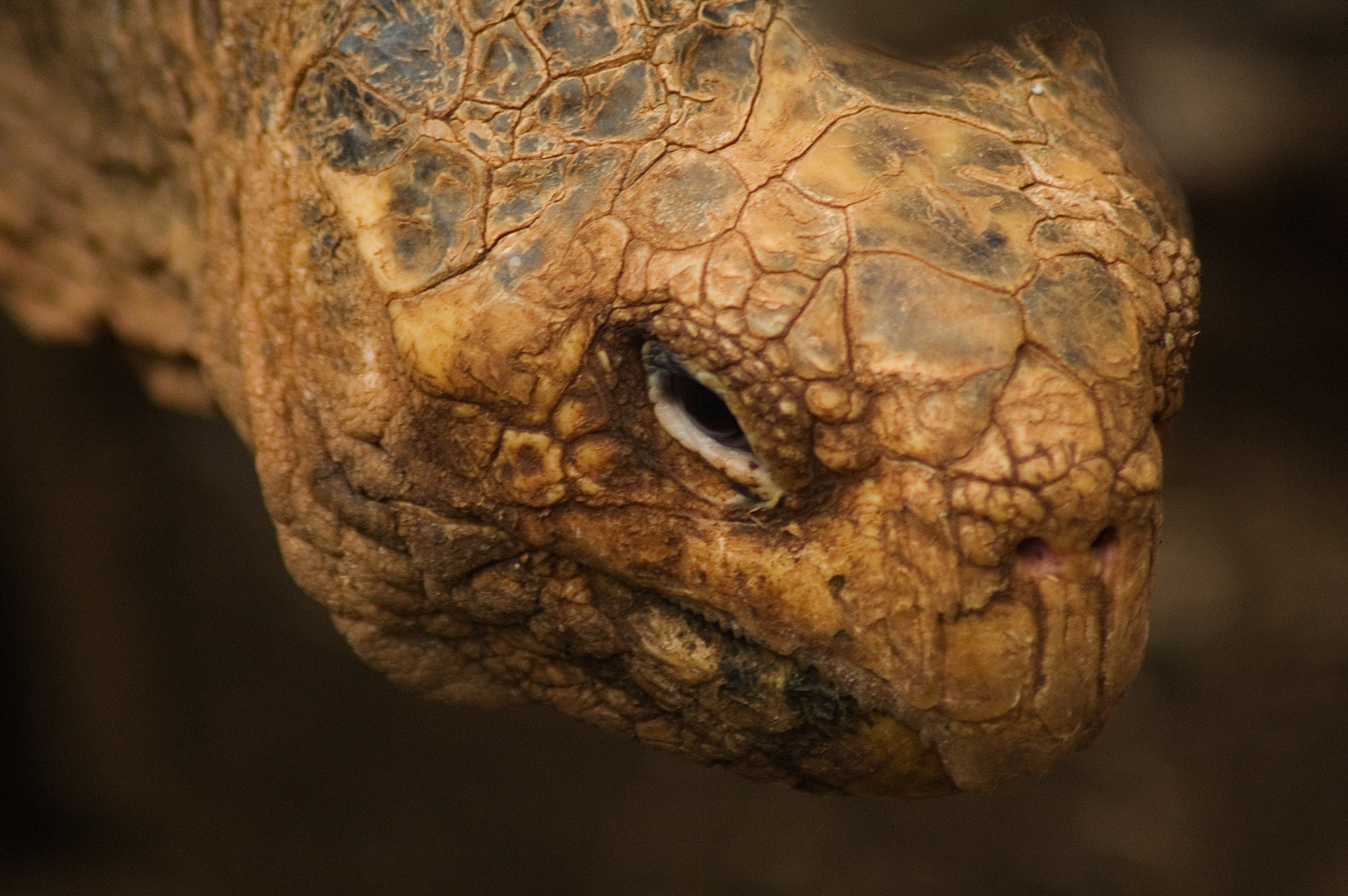
Detail of head, 2009

Diego is a Hood Island giant tortoise. Thought to have been hatched on Española Island, Galápagos, he was captured as a young adult and shipped to the United States where he was exhibited at zoos. By the late 1940s, he was at the San Diego Zoo, though his species was not known. A captive breeding effort for the critically endangered Hood Island tortoises was set up in 1976, by which time only 15 individuals were known to survive. Diego was identified as a Hood Island tortoise by DNA testing and was sent to Santa Cruz Island to join the program. Diego fathered more than 900 offspring who were released on Española which helped to increase the wild population to more than 2,000. The breeding program ended in January 2020 and Diego is officially retired, and was released into the wild in June 2020.

== Early life ==
Diego is thought to have been hatched on Española Island, one of the Galápagos Islands, before 1920. He was captured and transported to the United States as a young adult sometime between 1928 and 1933 as part of a shipment of tortoises from the Galápagos Islands sent to American zoos.

== Breeding program ==
The Hood Island giant tortoise (Chelonoidis niger hoodensis) was threatened by hunting for food and competition from goats and was declared critically endangered in the 1960s. A breeding program was set up in 1976, at which point there were only 12 females and 3 males remaining on the island. Only two of the males proved suitable for breeding, so the program searched for Española tortoises held in captivity. By this point Diego had been at the San Diego Zoo for 30 years, but his subspecies was unknown. DNA testing proved that he was a Hood Island tortoise, and he was transferred to Santa Cruz Island, Galápagos to join the program in 1977.

The three male tortoises were placed into breeding pens with different females and the offspring released onto Española as juveniles, once or twice a year. The survival rate of the offspring on the island was around 50%. During this time Diego fathered around 900 offspring, some 40% of the program's output. A second tortoise, known as E5, fathered most of the remaining 60%, with the third male, E3, producing very few offspring.

Despite E5's being more successful at reproducing, Diego has received the majority of media attention and has been said to have "had so much sex he saved his species (sic)". This is believed to be because E5 had a more reserved character, a less interesting name, and was seldom witnessed in the act of mating. Diego, by comparison, has been described as aggressive, active and vocal in the act of mating, which in turn made him popular with the female tortoises.

== Retirement ==
Diego remained with the breeding program until it ended in January 2020. By this time the program had increased the number of tortoises on Española to 2,000 individuals, considered to be self-sufficient without new influxes of juveniles from the program. Diego and 14 other tortoises from the program were released on Española on 15 June 2020. It is thought that he could live to reach 150 years old. At the time of his release he weighed 80 kilograms (180 lb) and measured 90 centimetres (35 in) in length at 1.5 metres (4.9 ft) in height at full stretch.
