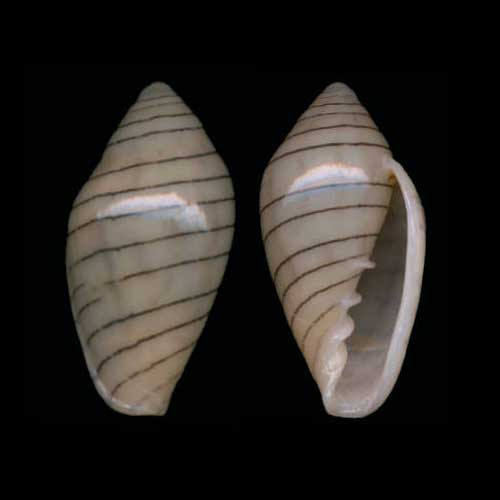
- Apertural (right) and abapertural (left) views of a shell of M. diadochus

Scientific classification
- Kingdom: Animalia
- Phylum: Mollusca
- Class: Gastropoda
- Subclass: Caenogastropoda
- Order: Neogastropoda
- Family: Marginellidae
- Genus: Marginella
- Species: M. diadochus

Binomial name
- Marginella diadochus A. Adams & Reeve, 1848

= Marginella diadochus =

Species of gastropod

Marginella diadochus is a species of sea snail, a marine gastropod mollusk in the family Marginellidae, the margin snails.
