= Diego (band) =

- Origin: Karlsruhe, Germany
- Genres: Indie rock, post-punk
- Years active: 2005–present
- Labels: Rookie, Noisedeluxe, Unter Schafen
- Members: Andreas Mutter Christian Fluri; Drazan Dodik; Ralf Helfrich Raymar Laux (since 2009)
- Website: www.diego-music.com

Diego is an Indie rock band from Karlsruhe, Germany, formed in 2005.

== History ==
After its formation in 2005, the band released eight songs on an EP titled Diego in 2007 on Rookie Records. In April 2008, the first full-length studio Album, Two, was recorded which was released on 31 October 2008 by Noisedeluxe Records. The album received a favourable review from the Plattentests.de webzine that noted a melancholic and longing mood in the songs. The Sonic Seducer wrote about a "cool elegance" of this album and highlighted the guitar arrangements.

In 2010, Diego met the producer Kurt Ebelhäuser to record the second album Gold. It was released on 24 September 2010 by Unter Schafen Records. The Intro magazine called it "generally a step ahead" but also criticised Diego for again being too arbitrary, for showing too few characteristics and rough edges. Sonic Seducer, though, lauded the increasing use of bass lines and called it a work of post-punk "with a throaty voice and twirling guitars" whose style was allegedly rare in Germany. The Motor.de webzine commented that Diego had a style of its own.

== Style ==
Diego plays indie rock with influences from New Wave and is often compared to bands like Joy Division, Editors and Interpol. In the case of the album Two, these similarities have even led to repeated accusations of plagiarism.

== Discography ==
=== EP ===
- Diego (2007), Rookie

=== Albums ===
- Two (2008), Noisedeluxe
- Gold (2010), Unter Schafen
