= Diadochoupolis =

Diadochoupolis (Greek: Διαδοχούπολις, "city of the Diadochi") was a city in ancient Mesopotamia. The only source referring to it is a short mention by Stephanus Byzantius, who records that it was "οὺ πόρρω Κτησιφῶντος" ("not far from Ctesiphon"). It was located probably in the region of Sittacene in Mesopotamia on the bank of the river Tornadottos. Its inhabitants were known as Diadochenoi.
