= USS San Diego =

USS San Diego may refer to:

- USS San Diego (CA-6), originally the armored cruiser California (1907–1914); renamed San Diego (1914–1918)
- USS San Diego (CL-53), a light cruiser commissioned in 1942 in service throughout the Pacific War, and decommissioned 1946
- USS San Diego (AFS-6), a combat stores ship in service from 1969 to 1997
- USS San Diego (LPD-22), a San Antonio-class amphibious transport dock, launched in 2010
