= Saint Diego =

Saint Diego, Saint Didacus or San Diego may refer to:

- Didacus of Alcalá (d. 1463), missionary to the Canary Islands
- Juan Diego (d. 1548), first Native American Catholic saint
- Daniel Andreas San Diego (b. 1978), American animal liberationist and domestic terrorism suspect
