= Diego (surname) =

Diego (or de Diego) is a Spanish surname. Notable people with the name include:

- Felipe Clemente de Diego y Gutiérrez (1866–1945), Spanish jurist
- Gabino Diego (born 1966), Spanish actor
- Gerardo Diego (1896–1987), Spanish poet
- José de Diego (1866–1918), Puerto Rican statesman, journalist and poet

== See also ==
- Carmen Sandiego (character)
