= Española Island =

Island in Ecuador

Española Island (Hood Island)
- Location within Galápagos Islands

Geography
- Location: Galápagos Islands, Ecuador
- Coordinates: 1.38°S 89.68°W
- Archipelago: Galápagos Islands

Administration
- Ecuador

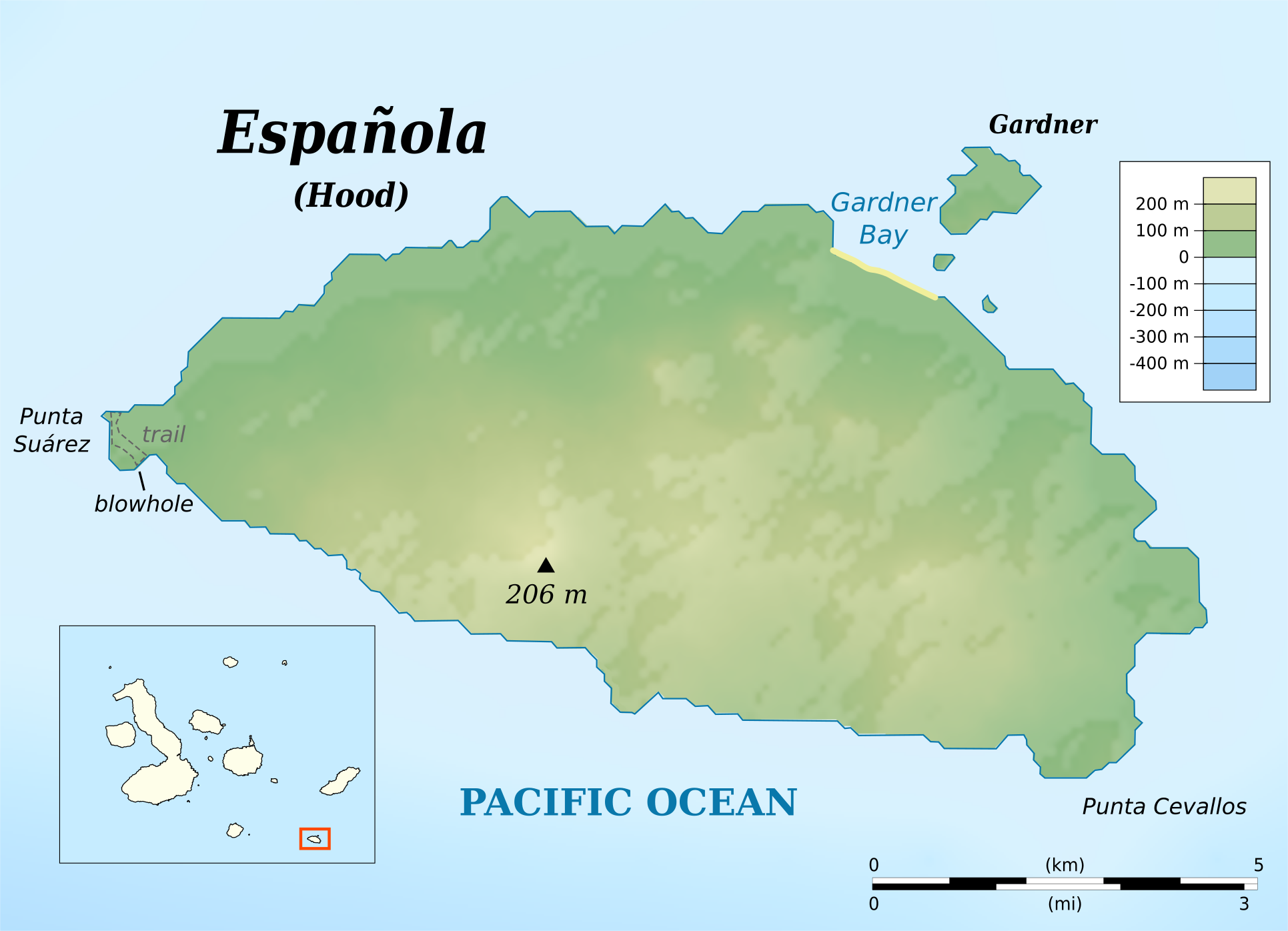
Topographic map of Española

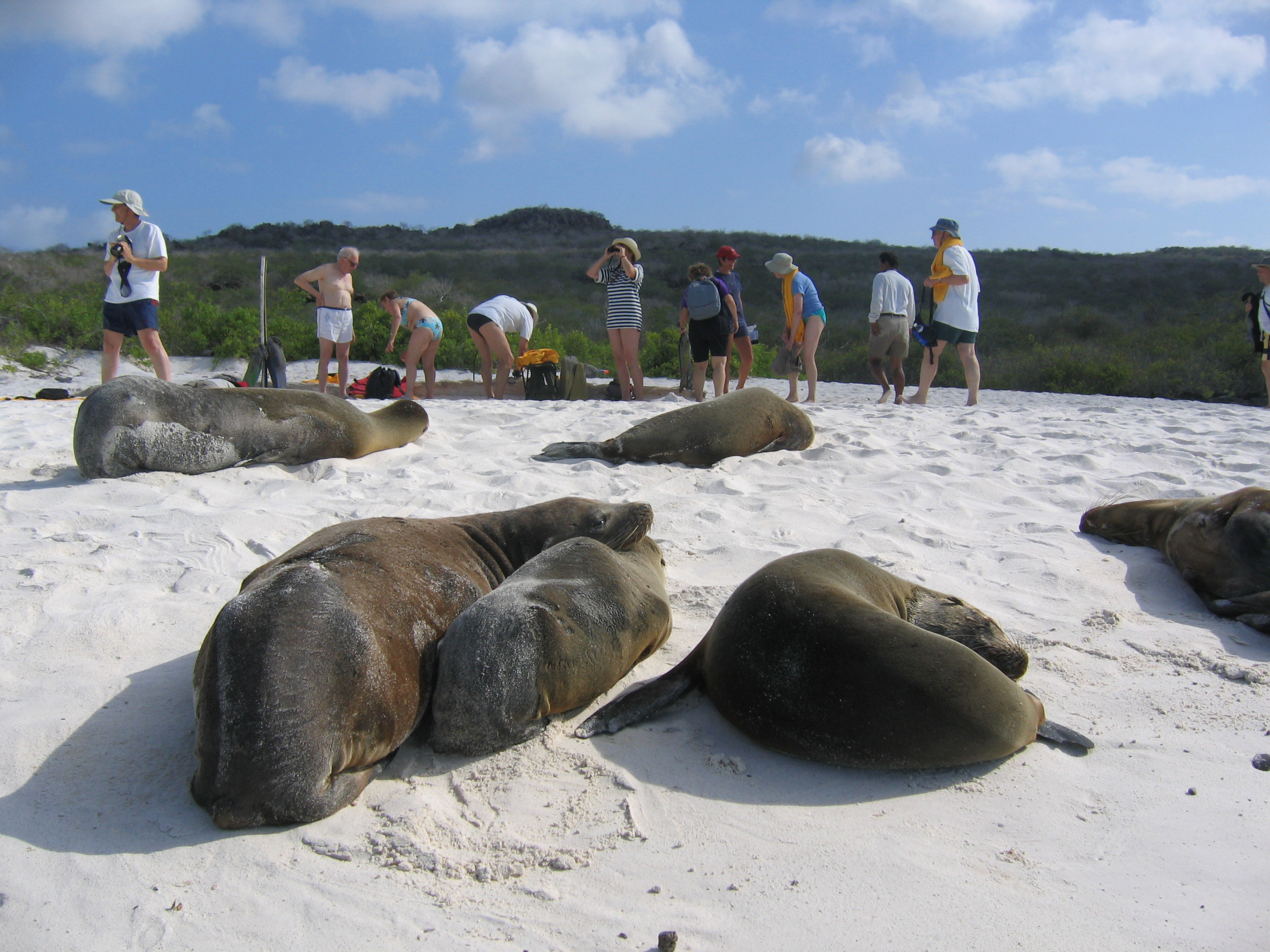
Gardner Bay

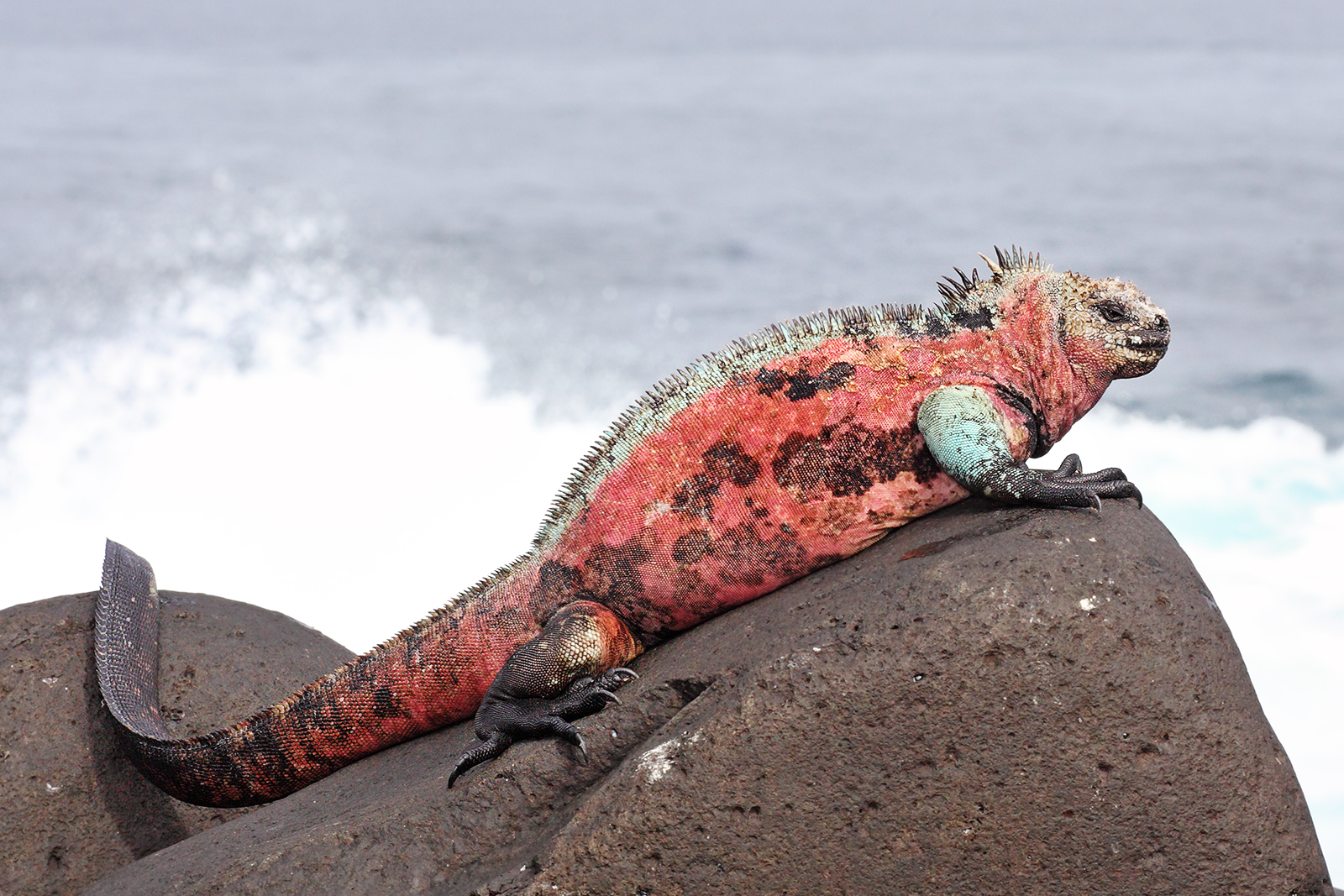
Highly colored individual of the venustissimus subspecies endemic to Española and Floreana Islands

Española or Espanola Island (Spanish: Isla Española) is the most southerly of the Galápagos Islands in Ecuador, about a 10 to 12-hour trip by boat from Santa Cruz.

== Names ==
Española, Spanish for Spanish, is named for Hispaniola in the Caribbean Sea owing to its discovery by Christopher Columbus on his first voyage. The name was changed with several other islands in 1892 during the celebration of the quadricentennial of Columbus's voyage.

The English pirate William Ambrosia Cowley named the island King Charles's Island in 1684 in honor of the then-reigning monarch Charles II of England. However, the British captain James Colnett later misunderstood Cowley's maps and accidentally transferred that name to what is now Floreana Island. Thinking Española undiscovered until that point, he renamed it Hood Island in 1793 in honor of Admiral Samuel Hood, Baronet of Catherington and 1st Baron Hood, later created 1st Viscount Hood for his success in the Napoleonic Wars.

== Geography ==
Española is one of Ecuador's Galápagos Islands. Located at the extreme southeast of the archipelago, it is considered to be one of the oldest of the islands, having first formed approximately four million years ago. The climate is generally dry, receiving only a few inches of rain per year.

== Wildlife ==
While Española Island is one of the oldest of the Galápagos Islands, this island is dying, slowly becoming a rocky, barren land with little or no vegetation. Its large bays, however, have soft sand and attract Galápagos sea lions. A major draw is the waved albatrosses since, from March to January, almost the entire world population breeds on the island. Another draw is the mating dances of blue-footed boobies. Two spots are especially popular, Gardner Bay (Bahía Gardner) with its beach and Suarez Point (Punta Suárez) because of its varied bird-life.

The island has its own species of animals, such as the Hood mockingbird, which has a longer and more curved beak than the one on the central islands; the Española lava lizard; and the marine iguana of the subspecies venustissimus, which has red markings on its back. There are also swallow-tailed gulls, Galapagos hawks, and other birds. The island has been recognized as an Important Bird Area (IBA) by BirdLife International. In January 2020, it was widely reported that a male Galápagos tortoise named Diego fathered and resurrected the island tortoise population, saving the diminishing species from near extinction.

== In popular culture ==
The American author Herman Melville mentions the island in his 1854 novella The Encantadas. The 1982 novel La Iguana by Spanish author Alberto Vázquez-Figueroa takes place on the island. The novel was later dramatized as the 1988 film Iguana by American director Monte Hellman.
