= Santiago (disambiguation) =

Santiago is the capital city of Chile.

Four other notable cities often referred to as simply "Santiago" are:

- Santiago de Compostela, Spain
- Santiago de Cuba, Cuba
- Santiago de los Caballeros, Dominican Republic
- Santiago, Isabela, Philippines

Santiago may also refer to:

== Other places ==
=== Argentina ===
- Santiago del Estero Province
  - Santiago del Estero, capital of the province

=== Brazil ===
- Santiago, Rio Grande do Sul

=== Cape Verde ===
- Santiago, Cape Verde

=== Chile ===
- Santiago (commune)
- Santiago Province, Chile
- Santiago Metropolitan Region

=== Colombia ===
- Santiago, Norte de Santander
- Santiago, Putumayo
- Santiago de Cali

=== Costa Rica ===
- Santiago District, Palmares
- Santiago District, Paraíso
- Santiago District, Puriscal
- Santiago District, San Rafael
- Santiago District, San Ramón

=== Cuba ===
- Santiago de Cuba Province
  - Santiago de Cuba, capital of the province
  - Battle of Santiago de Cuba
- Santiago de las Vegas

=== Dominican Republic ===
- Santiago Province (Dominican Republic)

=== Ecuador ===
- Santiago de Guayaquil, coastal city
- Santiago de Quito, 1534 Spanish settlement in Colta Canton, Chimborazo, moved north later that year and renamed San Francisco de Quito
- Santiago Island (Galápagos)

=== Guatemala ===
- Santiago Sacatepéquez
- Santiago Atitlán, the capital of the Tz'utujil people in pre-Columbian times
- Santiago de los Caballeros de Guatemala

=== Jamaica ===
- Colony of Santiago, a Spanish possession that later became Jamaica
- Santiago de la Vega or Spanish Town

=== Mexico ===
- Santiago de Querétaro
- Santiago el Pinar, Chiapas
- Santiago, Nuevo León
- Santiago, Baja California Sur
- Santiago River (Eastern Mexico), a river of Veracruz
- Santiago River (Mexico), the outlet of Lake Chapala and the longest river entirely in Mexico
- Santiago Maravatío, Guanajuato
- Santiago Tianguistenco, a city in the State of México
- Santiago, Oaxaca (disambiguation), several places
- Baluarte de Santiago, a fortification in Veracruz
- Santiago Ixcuintla, a city in Nayarit

=== Nicaragua ===
- Santiago de los Caballeros de León

=== Panama ===
- Santiago District, Veraguas, a district of Veraguas Province
- Santiago (corregimiento), the seat of Santiago District
- Santiago de Veraguas, the capital of Veraguas Province

=== Paraguay ===
- Santiago, Paraguay, a town and district in Misiones Department

=== Peru ===
- Santiago District, in Cusco Province of the Cusco Region
- Santiago de Surco, a district of Lima
- Santiago de Chuco, Santiago de Chuco District, a province of the La Libertad region
- Santiago River (Peru), a tributary of the Marañón River

=== Philippines ===
- Santiago, Agusan del Norte
- Santiago, Ilocos Sur
- Cape Santiago, a cape at the southwestern tip of Luzon
- Santiago Island (Pangasinan), an island off of western Luzon

=== Portugal ===
- Santiago (Lisbon), a parish in the municipality of Lisbon
- Santiago (Tavira), a parish in the municipality of Tavira
- Santiago do Cacém, a parish and a municipality in the Setúbal
- Santiago de Piães, a parish in the municipality of Cinfães
- Vale de Santiago, a parish in the municipality of Odemira
- Santiago Maior (Beja), a parish in the municipality of Beja

=== Puerto Rico ===
- Santiago River (Puerto Rico), a short river in Naguabo
- Caño de Santiago, a channel in Yabucoa

=== Spain ===
- Santiago (Valdés), a parish in the municipality of Valdés, Asturias
- Santiago (Sariego), a parish in the municipality of Sariego
- Santiago (comarca), a comarca in the province of A Coruña
- Santiago del Teide, Tenerife, Canary Islands
- Playa Santiago, La Gomera, Canary Islands

=== Taiwan ===
- Cape Santiago (Taiwan), a cape at the northeastern tip of Taiwan

=== United States ===
- Santiago, West Virginia
- Santiago Canyon, California
- Santiago Peak, a mountain in Orange County, California
- Santiago High School (Garden Grove, California)
- Santiago High School (Corona, California)
- Santiago Township, Sherburne County, Minnesota
- Santiago, Minnesota, an unincorporated community
- Santiago, Pennsylvania, an unincorporated community
- Santiago Peak (Texas), a mountain in Brewster County, Texas

=== Uruguay ===
- San Felipe y Santiago de Montevideo

=== Venezuela ===
- Santiago de León de Caracas
- Santiago de Los Caballeros de Mérida

== People ==
- Santiago (name), a Spanish given name
- Santiago (surname)
- Santiago (apostle), the Spanish name of James the Great, one of the Twelve Apostles of Jesus
- Santiago (footballer, born 1976), full name Elisandro Naressi Roos, Brazilian footballer
- Santiago (footballer, born 1980), full name Petrony Santiago de Barros, Brazilian footballer
- Santiago (footballer, born 1984), full name Rafael Santiago Maria, Brazilian footballer

== Ships ==
- Santiago (caravel), one of the ships of the Magellan Expedition
- Santiago (1551), a supply ship of the Spanish Armada that wrecked south of Bergen, Norway, in 1588
- Santiago (1856), a British barque, now in the Garden Island Ships' Graveyard near Port Adelaide, Australia
- Santiago, an American schooner barge that operated with the SS Appomattox until its wreck
- Santiago (1502 ship), one of the ships of Columbus's fourth voyage

== Media and entertainment ==
- Santiago (album), a 1996 album by The Chieftains
- Santiago (band), an American indie/punk band
- "Santiago", a song by Loreena McKennitt from The Mask and Mirror
- Santiago (1956 film), an American film directed by Gordon Douglas
- Santiago (2007 film), a Brazilian film directed by João Moreira Salles
- Santiago: a Myth of the Far Future, a science fiction novel by Mike Resnick
- San Tiago (recording), a bootleg recording of Pink Floyd in 1975

== Other uses ==
- Santiago City FC, a Chilean association football club
- Santiago (genus), a genus of Eucerine bees
- Santiago (horse), racehorse, winner of the 2020 Irish Derby
- Santiago (The Vampire Chronicles), in Anne Rice's novel Interview with the Vampire
- Santiago (volleyball club), a women's team in Santiago, Dominican Republic
- ¡Santiago!, a shortened form of the Reconquista battle cry "Santiago y cierra, España"
- Order of Santiago, a Spanish knightly order
- Tarta de Santiago, an almond cake or pie from Spain with origin in the Middle Ages
- RHEL 6 operating system, nicknamed "Santiago"
- Samtiaokioe Kongsi, an historical Chinese kongsi federation in Borneo, sometimes spelled "Santiago Republic"
- San Tiago Dantas (1911–1964), Brazilian politician

== See also ==
- Santiago Island (disambiguation)
- Santiago Maior (disambiguation)
- Santiago Province (disambiguation)
- Santiago River (disambiguation)
- Tiago (disambiguation)
- Saint James (disambiguation)
- San Diego (disambiguation)
- Diogo (disambiguation)
- São Tiago
