= Santiago (surname) =

- Pronunciation: English: /ˌsæntiˈɑːɡoʊ/, US also /ˌsɑːn-/; Spanish: [sanˈtjaɣo] Tagalog: [santɪago], alternately [-tʃa-]
- Language: Spanish

Origin
- Origin: Galician, Spanish, Portuguese
- Meaning: "Saint James"
- Region of origin: Galicia, Spain

Other names
- Variant form: Santhiago

Santiago is a Spanish, Portuguese, and Galician surname. The surname Santiago was first found in Galicia, Spain. There are other forms that are shortened versions of Santiago: Sant, Santo, Sancto, Sancti, Sanct, Sanctis Santi. Also, these spellings apply to all the righteous men of the Calendar of the days of the Patron Saints. Santiago is a habitational name from any of the numerous places named for the dedication of churches to St. James (Sant Iago).

The name de Santiago / Sousa de Santiago is also the name of an Afro-Creole noble family with roots in Portugal and Spain. Descendants can be found in Puerto Rico, Portugal, Louisiana, Cuba, and Brazil.

== People ==
- Adalberto Santiago (born 1937), Puerto Rican salsa singer
- Americo Santiago (born 1951), American politician
- Anuel AA [birth name: Emmanuel Gazmey Santiago] (born 1992), Puerto Rican singer
- Bea Rose Santiago (born 1990), Filipino actress
- Benito Santiago (born 1965), Puerto Rican baseball player
- Benito Santiago Jr. (born 1989), son of the above; Puerto Rican basketball player
- Brytiago [birth name: Bryan Cancel Santiago] (born 1992), Puerto Rican singer
- Carlos E. Santiago, Puerto Rican economist and educator, Chancellor of the University of Wisconsin-Milwaukee
- Carlos Manuel Rodríguez Santiago (1918–1963), beatified by Pope John Paul II in 2001; first Puerto Rican and first Caribbean-born layperson to be beatified
- Carlos Manuel Santiago (1926–2008), Puerto Rican baseball player
- Charles Santiago (born 1960), Malaysian politician
- Curtis Santiago (born 1979), Canadian musician
- Daniel Santiago (born 1976), Puerto Rican former NBA basketball player
- Eddie Santiago (born 1955), Puerto Rican salsa singer
- Eduardo Santiago Delpín, Puerto Rican surgeon; wrote the first book in Spanish about organ transplants
- Elena Santiago (1941–2021), Spanish writer
- Emílio Santiago (1946–2013), Brazilian singer
- Esmeralda Santiago (born 1948), Puerto Rican author
- Emile Santiago (1899–1995), American costume designer
- Ezequiel Santiago (1973–2019), American politician
- Hector Santiago (born 1987), American baseball player
- Héctor Santiago-Colón (1942–1968), Puerto Rican soldier, posthumously awarded the Medal of Honor
- Herman Santiago (born 1941), Puerto Rican rock and roll singer; composed song "Why Do Fools Fall in Love"
- Hugo Santiago (1939–2018), Argentine film director
- Irene Santiago, peace negotiator from the Philippines
- Jesús Manuel Santiago, Filipino poet and musician
- Joey Santiago (born 1965), Filipino-American guitarist of The Pixies and The Martinis
- Jordan Santiago (born 1991), Canadian soccer player and coach
- Jorge Santiago (born 1980), retired Brazilian mixed martial artist
- José Manuel Fernández Santiago (born 1958), Spanish politician
- Luis Santiago (1977–2005), Filipino TV director
- Manny Santiago (born 1985), Puerto Rican skateboarder
- Manuel Santiago Mendoza, Puerto Rican politician
- Manuela Santiago Collazo (1936–2010), Puerto Rican politician; Mayor of Vieques
- Margaret Santiago (1931–2018), American museum registrar
- María Elena Santiago (born 1932), widow of American rock and roll pioneer Buddy Holly
- Marikit Santiago (born 1985), Filipina-Australian artist
- Marvin Santiago (1947–2004), Puerto Rican salsa music singer
- Miriam Defensor Santiago (1945–2016), Filipino politician
- Nellie R. Santiago (born 1943), American politician; New York state senator
- O. J. Santiago (born 1974), Canadian NFL player
- Rafael Santiago Maria (born 1984), Brazilian footballer known as Santiago
- Ramón Santiago (born 1979), American baseball player and coach
- Randy Santiago (born 1960), Filipino singer and actor
- Renoly Santiago (born 1974), Puerto Rican actor
- Richard Santiago (born 1970), Puerto Rican boxer
- Ruben Santiago-Hudson (born 1956), American actor and playwright
- Saundra Santiago (born 1957), American actress
- Silviano Santiago (born 1936), Brazilian writer
- Sonia Santiago (born 1966), Spanish-born ballerina and ballet teacher in Germany
- Tony Santiago (born 1950), American military historian
- Valdemiro Santiago (born 1963), Brazilian evangelical pastor
- Vidal Santiago Díaz (1910–1982), Puerto Rican political activist
- Zoraida Santiago (born 1952), Puerto Rican singer and composer

== Fictional characters ==
- Amy Santiago, a detective in Brooklyn's ninety-ninth precinct in the comedy Brooklyn Nine-Nine
- Bobby Santiago, a supporting character in The Loud House and main character in The Casagrandes
  - Ronnie Anne Santiago, Bobby's sister in The Loud House and The Casagrandes
  - Maria Santiago, Bobby and Ronnie Anne's mother in The Loud House and The Casagrandes
  - Arturo Santiago, Bobby and Ronnie Anne's father in The Loud House and The Casagrandes
- Colonel Corazon Santiago, a faction leader in the PC strategy game Sid Meier's Alpha Centauri
- Mila Santiago, a character in Belgian series Ghost Rockers
- President Luis Santiago, in the television series Babylon 5
- Omar Santiago, in the television series Harsh Realm
- Raphael Santiago, a vampire from Cassandra Clare's Mortal Instruments series, as well as The Bane Chronicles, by the same author
- William Santiago, a member of the United States Marine Corps who was murdered at the Guantanamo Bay Naval Base in the movie A Few Good Men
- Santiago, a character in Mike Resnick's novels Santiago: a Myth of the Far Future (1986), and The Return of Santiago (2003)
- Santiago, a character on the United States television show Friday Night Lights, set in Texas (based on Buzz Bissinger's book)
- Santiago, the main character of Paulo Coelho's novel The Alchemist
- Santiago, a character in the novel Chronicle of a Death Foretold by Gabriel García Márquez
- Santiago, the titular character of Ernest Hemingway's The Old Man and the Sea

== See also ==
- Santiago (disambiguation)
- Santiago (name)
