= 2024 Ecuadorian blackouts =

Series of power outages in Ecuador

The 2024 Ecuadorian blackouts was caused by a severe drought that depleted water levels at hydroelectric plants and a lack of capacity buildup. Ecuador experienced rolling blackouts for up to 14 hours per day in the fall crisis (started on 23 September 2024) of 2024. The President of Ecuador Daniel Noboa had announced on 10 December, 2024 that the outages will end on December 20.

== Background ==
No new electric capacity had been added to the Ecuador power grid since Coca Codo Sinclair station started operation in 2016, while the demand by 2024 had increased by 24%, or about 400 megawatt (MW). The fossil fuel plants were neglected with just 880MW operational out of 2 gigawatts (GW) installed capacity. The low-cost electricity (at 10 US cents per kWh, with discounts for the industry) limited the private investment.

The 2023–2024 El Niño event might have further exacerbated the drought. The drought is considered to be the worst in 60 years, especially in the south of the country. When the power operator of Ecuador warned about the severe drought in January 2024, no actions were taken until April, when blackouts of up to 8 hours a day were implemented.

The (summer) dry season in 2024 arrived two months earlier than usual in Ecuador.

According to Miguel Calahorrano, an ex-minister of electricity and renewable energy, 400 MW of new capacity are needed annually to meet the demand, existing thermal plants need to fixed (in the fall only Trinitaria (125 MW), Machala Gas (125 MW), G. Zevallos (146 MW) and Jaramijó (140 MW) were operating at high power until October 15, 2024), and thermal power should be used to delay the day the reservoirs are tapped for generation. As quick fixes, he suggested improving relationship with Colombia, so that Ecuador can import electricity from there (and from Venezuela through Colombia).

== Events ==
On 24 September 2024, three power stations known as Paute Integral (Paute Dam, Mazar Dam, and Sopladora) ceased operations since the water levels were approaching critical marks. Power cuts up to 12 hours a day were implemented.

== Effects ==
Due to extensive use of diesel generators burning high-sulphur fuel, the air quality in Quito significantly deteriorated. At the peak of the spring 2024 crisis (with 8 hour blackouts per day),

- carbon monoxide quantities almost doubled;
- nitrogen dioxide levels went up almost 40%;
- sulfur dioxide content had risen by 180%, above the World Health Organization (WHO) norms;
- particulate matter (PM2.5) increased by 20% (this had been added by more traffic pollution due to inoperable traffic lights).

Three ministers of energy and non-renewable natural resources were fired during the crisis, with Andrea Arrobo accused of sabotage.

By late fall of 2024, the economic losses were estimated at 2 billion US dollars.

== See also ==
- 2009 Ecuador electricity crisis

== Sources ==
- Brown, Kimberley (2024-11-11). "'I'm switched off': frustration and fatigue as power cuts keep Ecuador in the dark". the Guardian.
- "¿Termina la crisis energética en Ecuador?: Noboa anuncia fin de apagones desde el 20 de diciembre". France 24 (in Spanish). 2024-12-10.
- Master Plan (2023). "Plan Maestro de Electricidad" [Master Plan for Electricity (2023-2032)]. Ministerio de Energía y Minas.
- "Three hydroelectric dams in Ecuador offline until water levels recover". Reuters. 2024-09-24.
- "Ecuador's Energy Crisis: The End of Blackouts and What Lies Ahead". The Rio Times. 2024-12-10.
- Segovia Velasteguí, Daniela (2024-10-16). "Miguel Calahorrano: "comprar termoeléctricas debe considerarse como la mejor solución en estos momentos"". Forbes Ecuador (in Spanish).
- "Ecuador Expands Power Cuts to 14 Hours a Day Due to Drought". US News & World Report. 2024-10-25.
- Zalakeviciute, Rasa; Diaz, Valeria; Rybarczyk, Yves (2024-10-05). "Impact of City-Wide Diesel Generator Use on Air Quality in Quito, Ecuador, during a Nationwide Electricity Crisis". Atmosphere. 15 (10): 1192. doi:10.3390/atmos15101192. ISSN 2073-4433.
