= Collazo =

Collazo is a surname from the Old Spanish word for farm servant or foster brother, with origins in the Latin word “collectors”. Despite the similar sound and spelling, it is largely unrelated to the Ialtian surnames of Colazzo and Collazzo, which come from the Italian word for “hill”, which is “colla”.

People with the surname Collazo

- Ariel Collazo, Uruguayan politician
- Julito Collazo (1925–2004), master percussionist
- Luis Collazo (born 1981), welterweight boxer
- Manuela Santiago Collazo (1936–2010), Puerto Rican politician
- Oscar Collazo (1914–1994), attempted assassin of U.S. President Harry S. Truman
- Patrice Collazo (born 1974), French rugby union footballer
- Ramón Collazo, Uruguayan carnival artist.
- Willie Collazo (born 1979), professional baseball pitcher

Surname popularity

- There are approximately 1,797 people in Spain with the surname Collazo, making it the 2,926 most common in the country.
- It is ranked 2,661 out of 88,799 in the United States.
