= Santiago River =

Santiago River may refer to:

- Santiago River (Ecuador), see Paute River
- Santiago River (Mexico), or Río Grande de Santiago
- Santiago River (Eastern Mexico)
- Santiago River District (Peru)
- Santiago River (Puerto Rico)
