= Héctor Gentile =

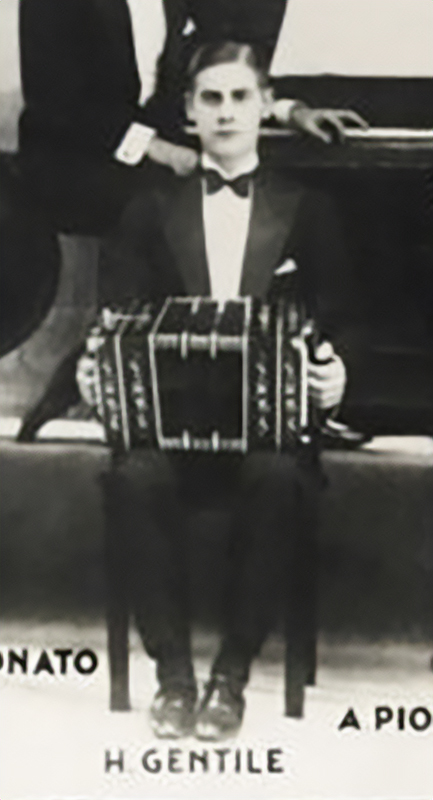
- Héctor Gentile
- Born: March 2, 1911; Montevideo, Uruguay
- Died: 1996 (aged 84–85)
- Occupations: Bandoneonist, pianist, orchestra conductor, composer

Héctor Gentile (March 2, 1911 – 1996) was a Uruguayan bandoneonist, pianist, orchestra conductor, and composer who had a distinguished career in popular music and tango in Uruguay.

Gentile was born in the Colón neighborhood of Montevideo, Uruguay. He began studying music and the bandoneon in childhood, and during his adolescence he formed a trio with Juan Baüer (known as Firpito) and the Argentine violinist Federico Lafémina.

Later, together with Juan Granese, he joined the orchestra of the violinist Roque Pietrafesa, with Juan B. D'Angelo on piano and Rochetti on drums.

He then joined the orchestra of the Café Avenida, with Luis Rolero on piano; Joaquín Barreiro on drums; Arturo Bettoni and Rochetti on violins; Luis D’Andrea and Ratinho on brass; and his fellow bandoneonists Héctor Artola and José María Mendizábal.

In 1927 he performed in Buenos Aires with the famous Donato–Zerillo Orchestra, also as a bandoneonist. The orchestra was made up of Edgardo Donato, Roberto Zerillo, and Antonio Piovani (violins); Héctor Gentile, Juan Turturiello, and Juan Spera (bandoneons); Osvaldo Donato (piano); Ascanio Donato (cello); and José Campesi (double bass).

After a year with that orchestra, he returned to Montevideo to work in the orchestras of Alberto Alonso and Juan Baüer. In 1930, Gentile joined Ramón Collazo’s orchestra along with several Uruguayan musicians, and they traveled to Buenos Aires to record for Odeon.

The following year he formed his own orchestra, in which Romeo Gavioli, among others, had the opportunity to perform.

== Works ==
- Me querés?
- Detrás de tus mentiras
