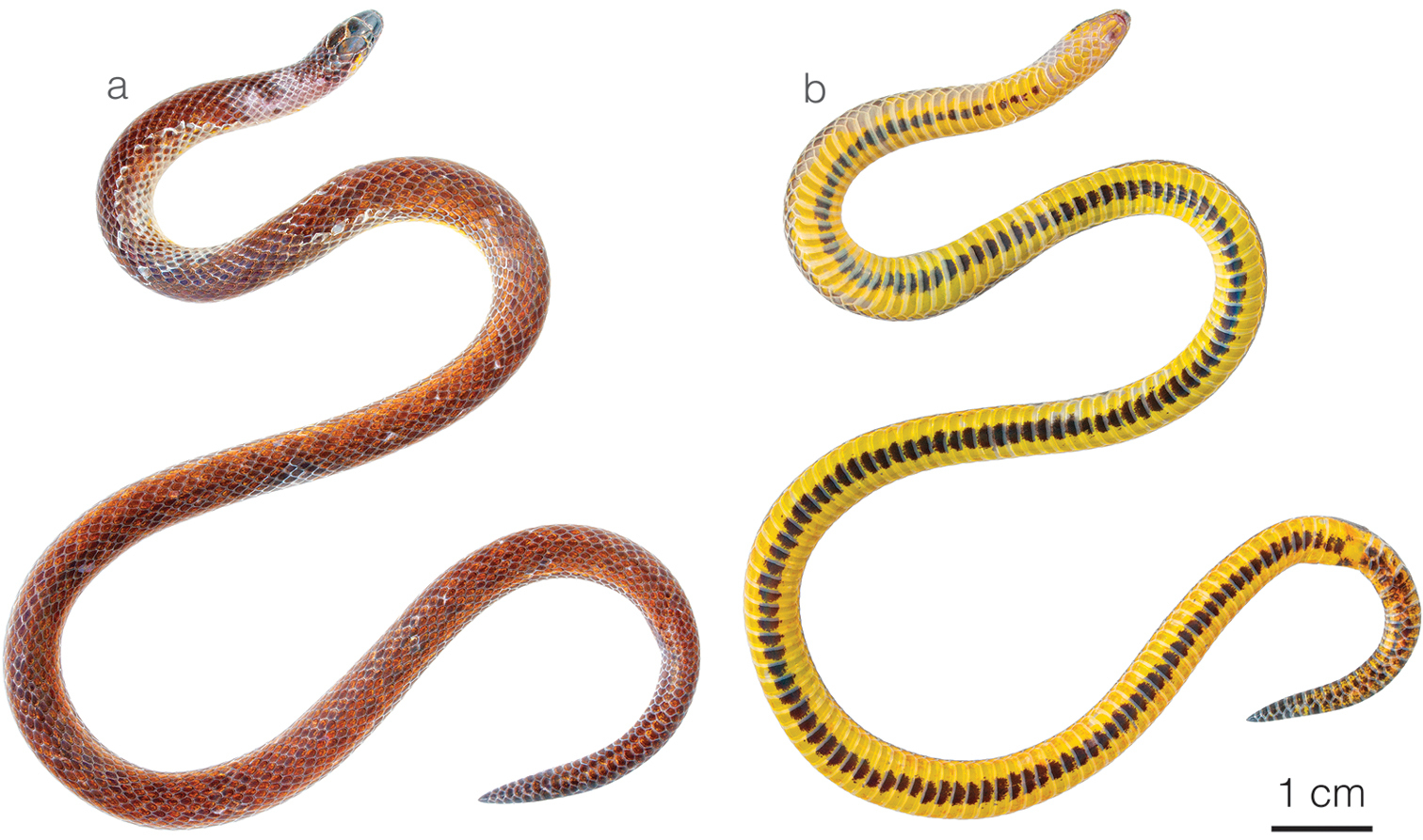

Scientific classification
- Kingdom: Animalia
- Phylum: Chordata
- Class: Reptilia
- Order: Squamata
- Suborder: Serpentes
- Family: Colubridae
- Genus: Atractus
- Species: A. discovery

Binomial name
- Atractus discovery Arteaga, Quezada, Vieira, & Guayasamin, 2022

= Atractus discovery =

Species of snake

Atractus discovery is a species of snake in the family Colubridae. The species can be found in Ecuador.

== Taxonomy ==
The species was described as Atractus discovery and placed within the genus Atractus following the diagnostic framework established by Jay Savage (1960). Phylogenetic analyses support its assignment to the genus. The species exhibits the typical morphological traits of Atractus, including smooth dorsal scales and a fossorial body form.

The specific epithet discovery is used as a noun in apposition and commemorates The Explorers Club Discovery Expedition Grants initiative, which supported the fieldwork that led to the species’ discovery.

== Description ==
The holotype is an adult male measuring 284 mm (11.2 in) in SVL and 28 mm (1.1 in) in tail length. It has a slightly distinct head, smooth dorsal scales arranged in 17 rows, and 168 ventral and 27 paired subcaudal scales. The species has eight supralabial scales (fourth and fifth contacting the eye), seven infralabials (first four contacting the chin shields), and a single postocular. The loreal scale is notably elongated, and the anal plate is single. Females are slightly larger, ranging from 308 to 328 mm (12.1 to 12.9 in) SVL with tails between 19 and 24 mm (0.75 and 0.94 in). In terms of scale counts, males have 168 ventral and 27 subcaudal scales, while females have 170 to 172 ventrals and 17 to 18 subcaudals. The dorsal color is light brown with faint darker speckling, while the belly is bright yellow with a distinct dark brown stripe running lengthwise.

Atractus discovery is compared with several other small, brownish Atractus species inhabiting the Amazonian slopes of the Andes. It differs from A. avernus, A. duboisi, A. occipitoalbus, and A. orcesi by having 17 dorsal scale rows rather than 15. From A. ecuadorensis, A. zgap, and A. resplendens, it is distinguished by its yellow belly with a dark stripe and by having only one postocular scale instead of two.

== Distribution and habitat ==
Atractus discovery is known from two nearby localities on opposite sides of the Paute River in southern Ecuador: Arenales (Azuay Province) and Amaluza (Morona Santiago Province), at elevations between 2002 and 2057 metres above sea level. The area lies on the Amazonian slope of the Andes and features a mix of montane and cloud forest.

Specimens have been found in disturbed habitats near forest edges, including pastures and cemetery clearings. One individual was observed at night crossing cement stairs, while others were found during the day buried in soft soil at depths of 15–40 cm (6–16 in). These records suggest a primarily fossorial lifestyle with occasional surface activity, possibly influenced by habitat disturbance or seasonal conditions.

== Conservation ==
The species is known from only three specimens collected in a single river valley. Although the region hosts a network of hydroelectric dams and has undergone extensive deforestation and land use conversion for pasture, the full distribution of the species is unknown. It is possible that additional populations exist in nearby unexplored habitats, including the adjacent Sangay National Park, which may provide suitable and protected environments.
