= 2009 Ecuador electricity crisis =

2009 massive power outages across Ecuador

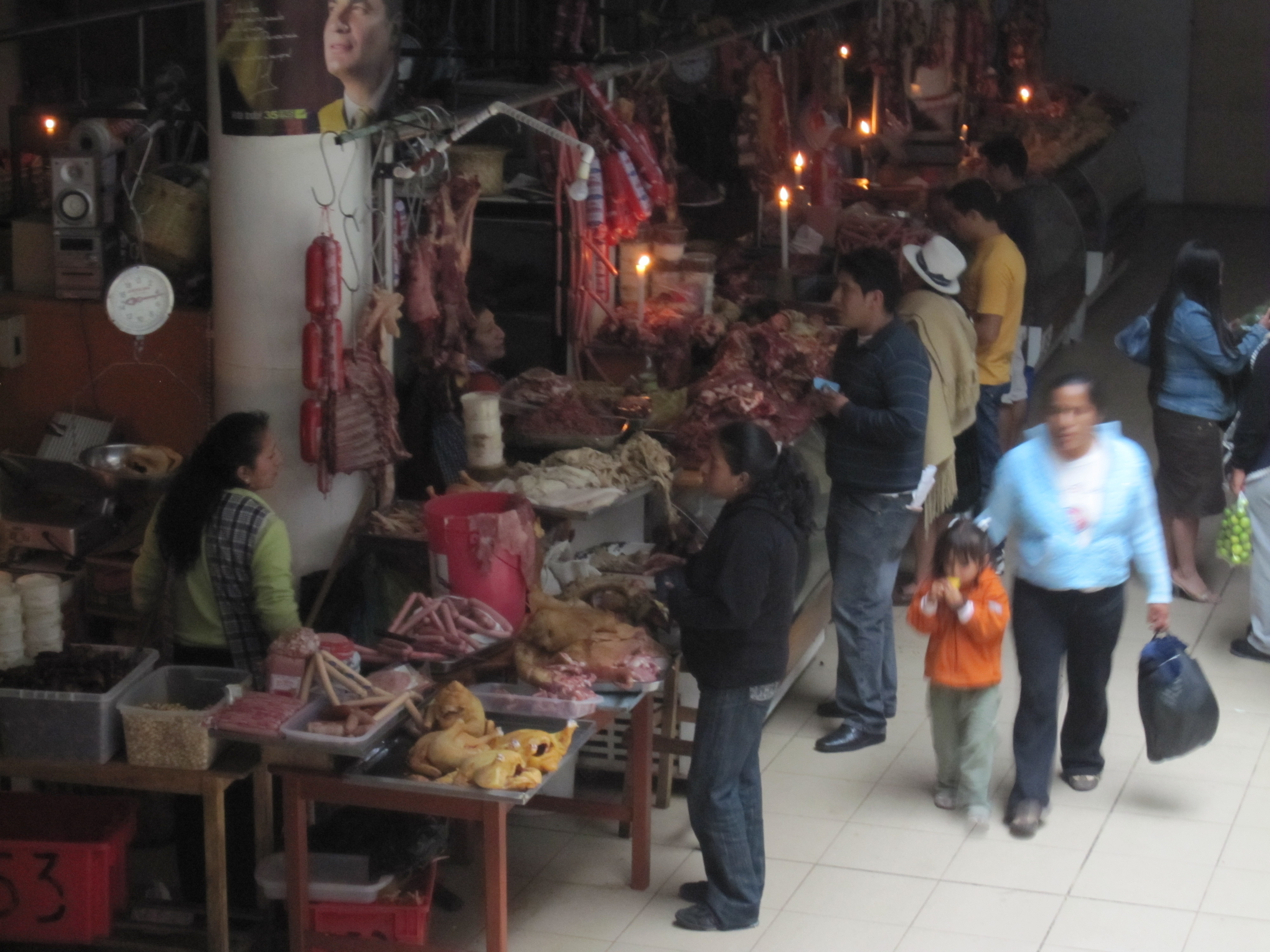
Shopping by candlelight in a Cuenca market during a power cut, November 24, 2009

The 2009 Ecuador electricity crisis was caused by a severe drought that depleted water levels at hydroelectric plants. Ecuador experienced rolling blackouts for two to six hours per day that lasted from November 2009 until January 2010.

== Background ==
The electricity crisis arose from Ecuador's worst drought in 40 years, which began in September 2009. Government experts attributed the drought to the El Niño phenomenon. Because of the drought, water levels at the Paute River dam—which normally supplies 40% of Ecuador's power—were extremely low. The reservoir's water level is normally 1,991 meters above sea level, but on November 10 was only 1,968 meters above sea level. The minimum level is 1,965 meters. As of November 11, only two of the dam's 10 turbines were functioning. Normally, the dam can supply up to 1,000 megawatts (MW), but the dam's output was only 200 MW on this day.

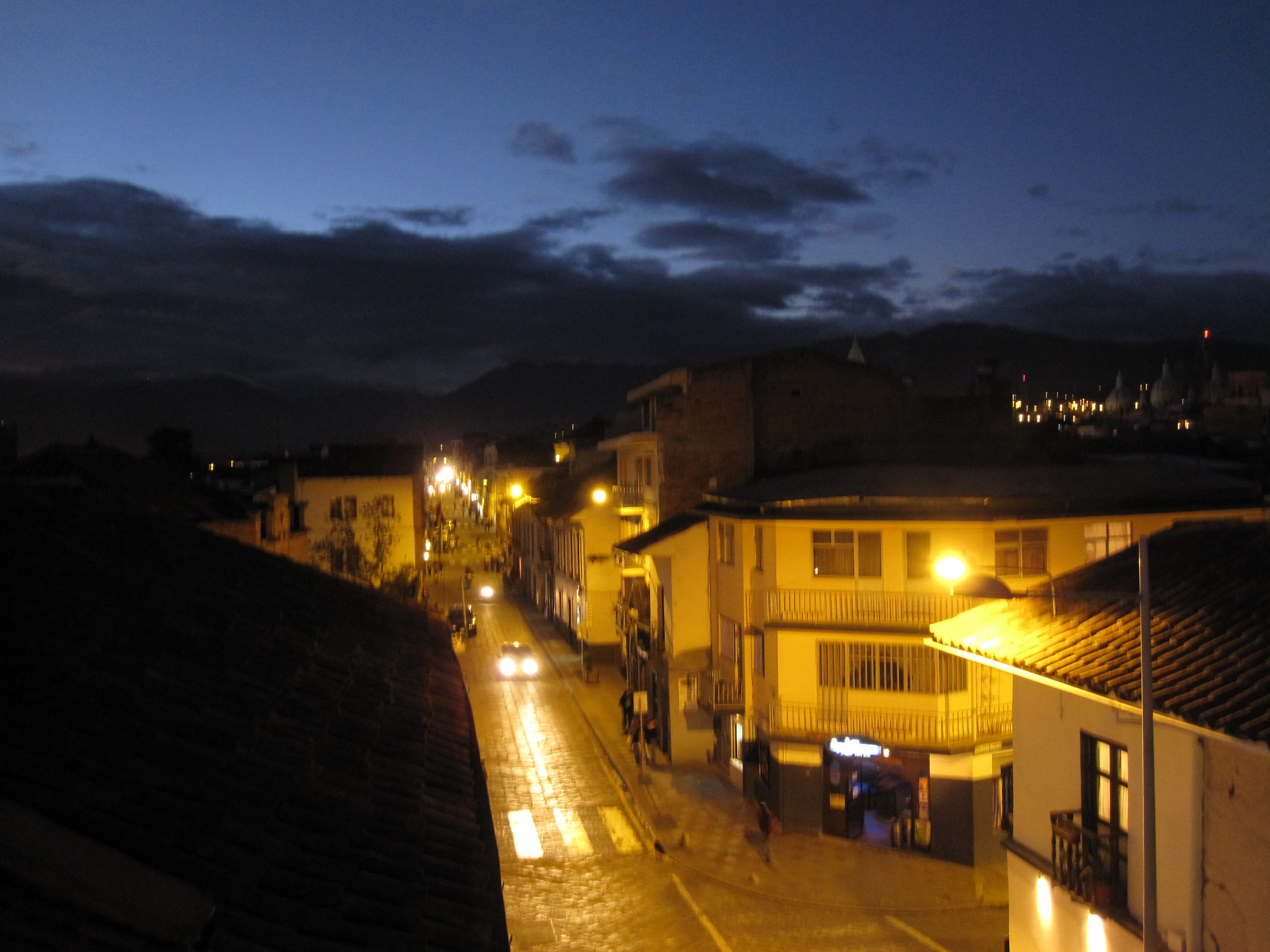
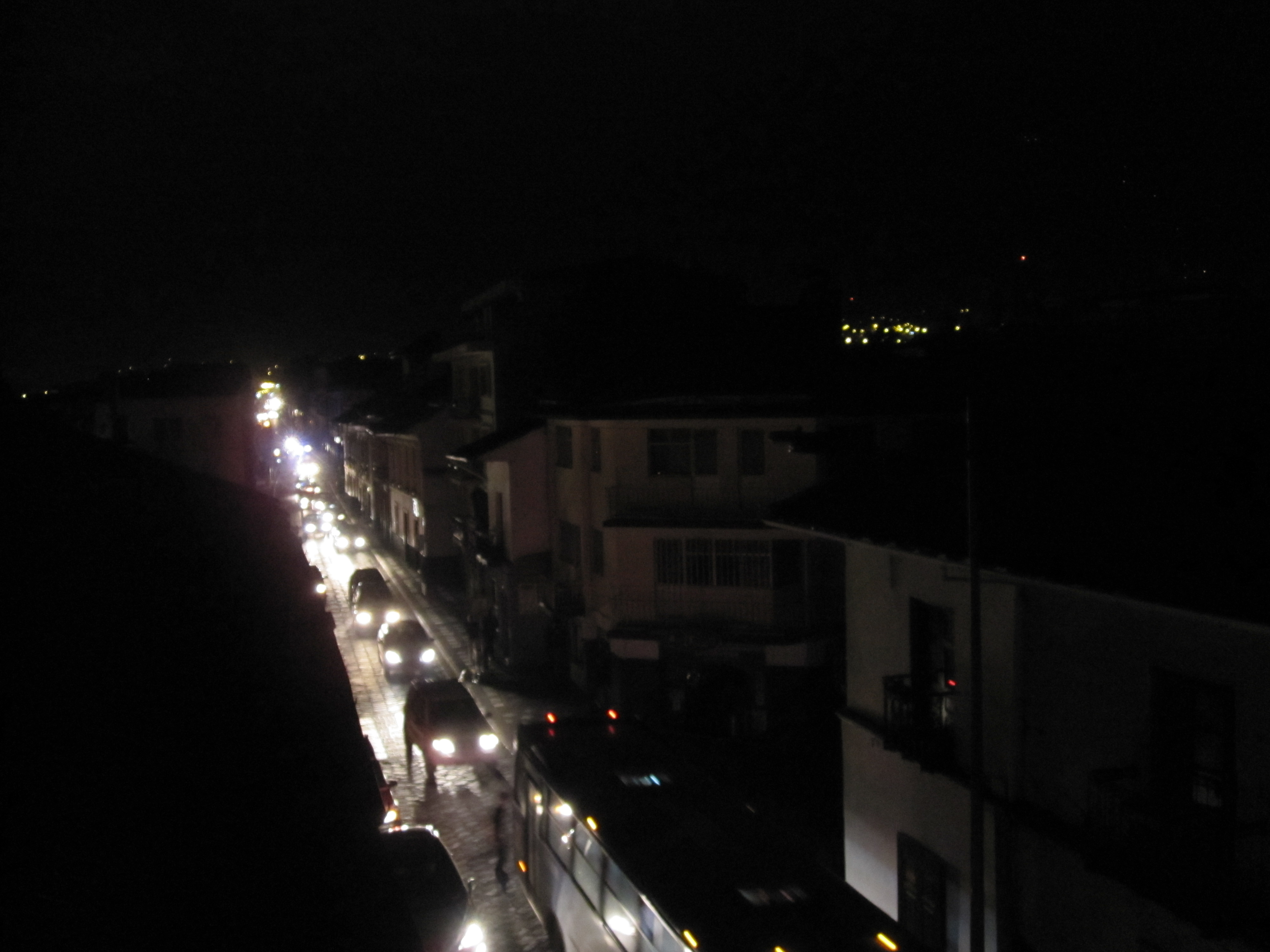
Left: View of Calle Larga, Cuenca, at 6:33 pm. On this day, the scheduled blackout occurred earlier in the day. Right: View of Calle Larga, Cuenca, at 7:04 pm. On this day, there was a scheduled blackout from 7-10 pm.

== Effects ==
Beginning November 5, rolling blackouts took place across Ecuador for two to six hours per day. Government officials also urged citizens to conserve energy. Economic losses from the blackouts are estimated to be in the tens of millions of dollars; factory output slowed, and storage of perishables was disrupted.

On November 6, the government declared an emergency in the power sector, which was expected to "allow the Finance Ministry to seek to guarantee fuel imports for thermoelectric plants". The government also agreed to purchase additional electricity from Peru and Colombia. Government officials aimed to end power rationing before Christmas.

The power crisis led to criticism of the Correa administration's management of the power sector as water levels of the reservoirs became depleted.

In mid-January 2010, the blackouts were "suspended indefinitely", following increased water levels and the acquisition of several generators. In February, Ecuador stopped the import of electricity from Colombia and Peru.

== See also ==
- 2024 Ecuadorian blackouts
- Energy crisis
