= Santiago Maior =

Santiago Maior may refer to the following places:

- Cape Verde:
  - Santiago Maior (Santa Cruz), a parish of the municipality of Santa Cruz, Cape Verde
- Portugal:
  - Santiago Maior (Alandroal), a parish in the municipality of Alandroal
  - Santiago Maior (Beja), a former parish in the municipality of Beja
  - Santiago Maior (Castelo de Vide), a parish in the municipality of Castelo de Vide
