= Mazar Dam =

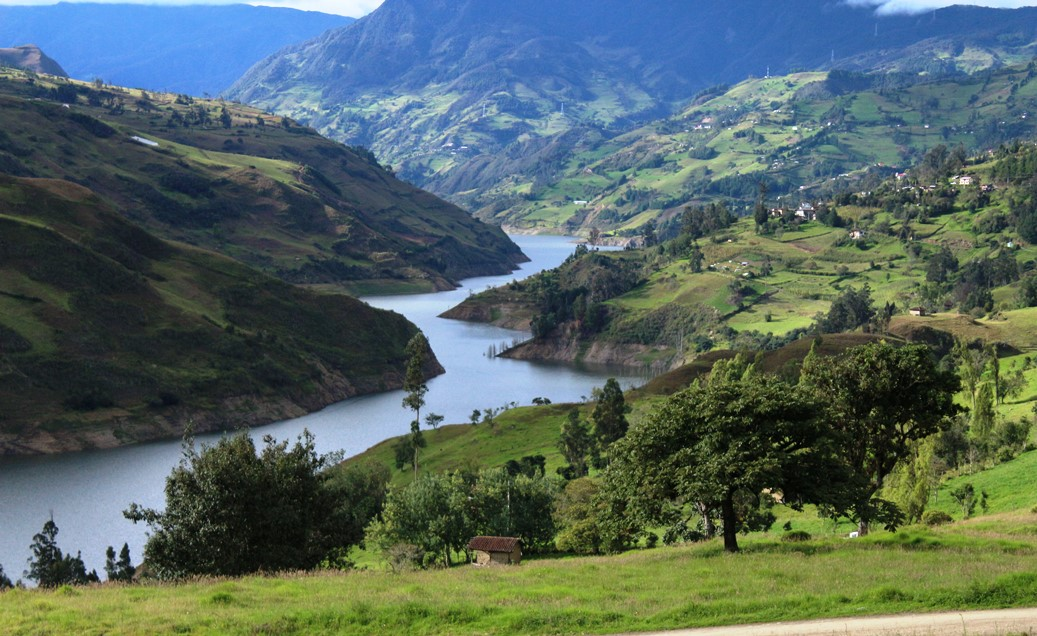

- Location within Ecuador
- Country: Ecuador
- Location: Cañar Province
- Coordinates: 2°35′31.71″S 78°37′03.58″W
- Purpose: Power
- Status: Operational
- Construction began: 2004; 22 years ago
- Opening date: 2010; 16 years ago
- Owner: Corporación Eléctrica del Ecuador (CELEC)

Dam and spillways
- Type of dam: Embankment, concrete-face rock-fill
- Impounds: Paute River
- Height: 166 m (545 ft)
- Length: 340 m (1,120 ft)
- Elevation at crest: 2,166 m (7,106 ft)
- Width (base): 500 m (1,600 ft)
- Dam volume: 5,483,000 m^{3} (193,600,000 cu ft)

Reservoir
- Active capacity: 309×10^{6} m^{3} (251,000 acre⋅ft)
- Inactive capacity: 410×10^{6} m^{3} (330,000 acre⋅ft)
- Catchment area: 4,388 km^{2} (1,694 sq mi)
- Maximum length: 31 km (19 mi)
- Normal elevation: 2,153 m (7,064 ft)

Power Station
- Commission date: 2010
- Hydraulic head: 68 m (223 ft)
- Turbines: 2 x 85 MW (114,000 hp) Francis-type
- Installed capacity: 170 MW (230,000 hp)
- Annual generation: 800 gigawatt-hours (2,900 TJ) (est.)

The Mazar Dam is a concrete-face rock-fill dam on the Paute River Cañar Province, Ecuador. The purpose of the dam is hydroelectric power generation and it is located directly upstream of the Paute Dam as part of the Amaluza-Molino project. The dam's power station has an installed capacity of 170 megawatts (230,000 hp). Construction on the dam began in 2004; the generators were commissioned in 2010 and the remaining works were completed in 2011. The power generation consists of two turbines of 90 MW, fed by a 384m power tunnel and a 60m high vertical shaft leading into the powerhouse. The powerhouse is 64 m long, 20 m wide and 39 m high, and houses two Francis-type turbines.
