= Santiago Island (Galápagos) =

Volcanic Island in the Galápagos Archipelago

Santiago Island (James Island)
- Location within Galápagos Islands

Geography
- Location: Galápagos Islands, Ecuador
- Coordinates: 0.252364°S 90.717952°W
- Archipelago: Galápagos Islands
- Highest elevation: 906 m (2972 ft)
- Highest point: Cerro Pelado

Administration
- Ecuador

Demographics
- Population: 0

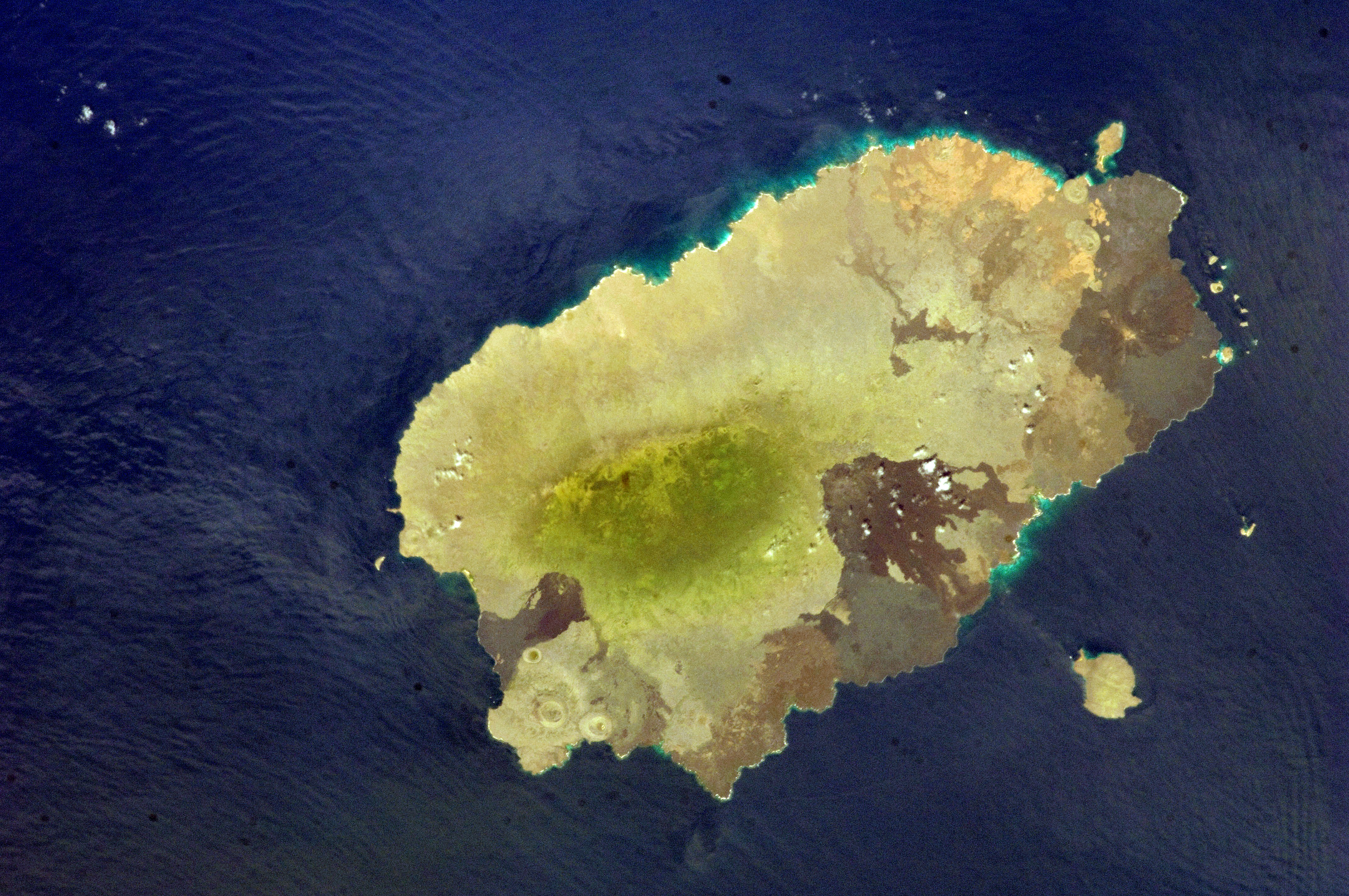
View of Santiago Island with northeast at the top

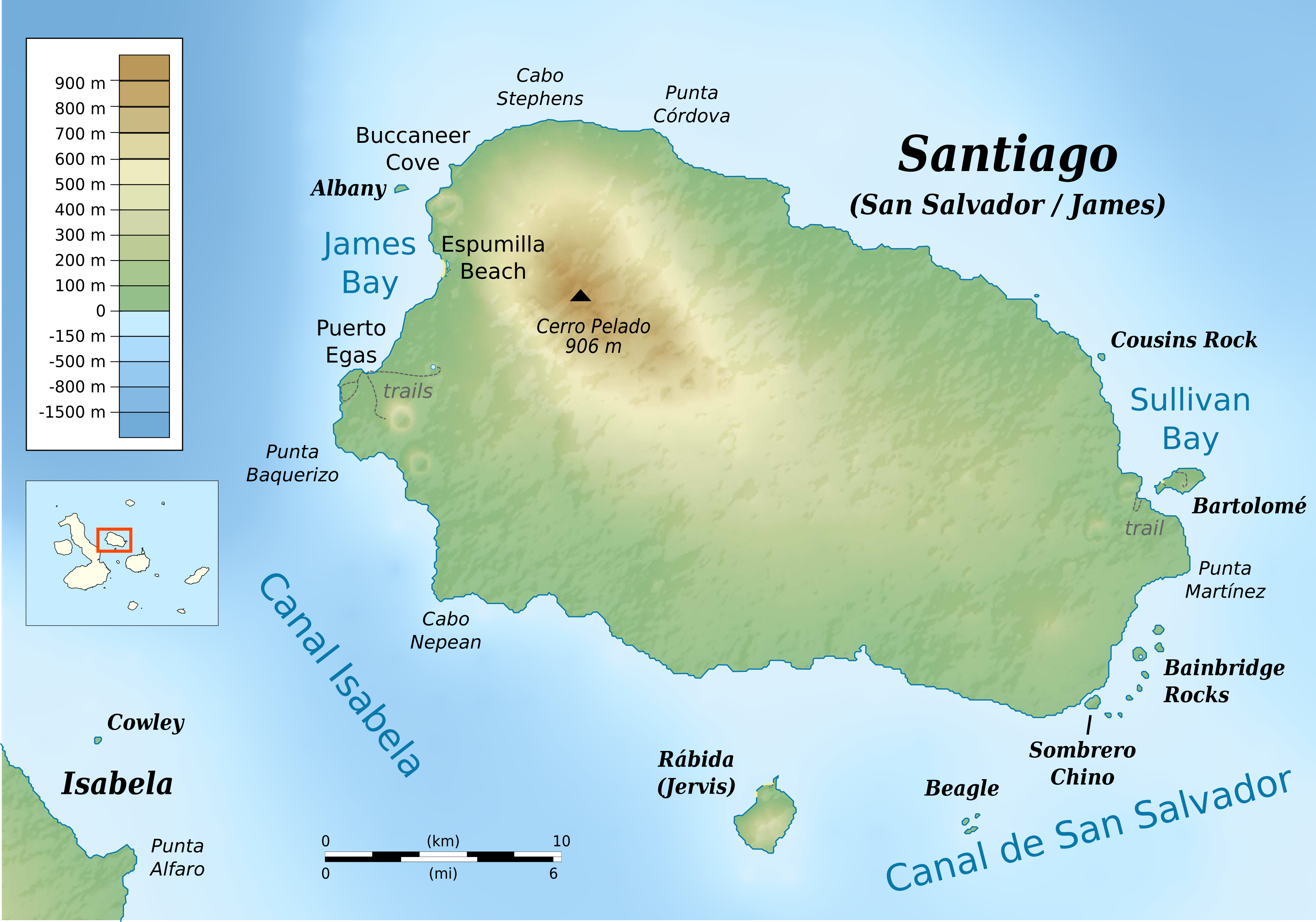
Topographic map with north at the top

Santiago Island is one of the Galápagos Islands. The island, which consists of two overlapping volcanoes, has an area of 585 square kilometers (226 mi^{2}) and a maximum altitude of 907 meters (2,976 ft), atop the northwestern shield volcano. The volcano in the island's southeast erupted along a linear fissure and is much lower. The oldest lava flows on the island date back to 750,000 years ago.

== Names ==
The original Spanish name was San Marcos Island (Isla or Ysla San Marcos), honoring Saint Mark the Evangelist. In 1892, as part of Ecuador's celebration of the quadricentennial of Columbus's first voyage, it was renamed Salvador or San Salvador Island (Isla San Salvador) after the first island Columbus reached. Isabela and Fernandina were similarly renamed for the third and fourth islands. The present name Santiago ([sanˈtjaɣo]) is the Spanish name of Saint James and a major center of pilgrimage in northern Spain.

In English, the island has also been known as Duke of York's Island, King James's Island, and James Island, all in honor of King James II of England and Ireland and VII of Scotland. The name was originally bestowed by the pirate William Ambrosia Cowley in 1684 and altered in 1685 after James's coronation. Cowley had similarly named Floreana Island King Charles's Island after Charles II.

== Geology ==
Santiago Island is one of the islands in the Galapagos Archipelago. It was formed from a shield volcano eponymously named Santiago. The oldest lava flows on the island date back to 750,000 years ago. The low, flat summits of the volcano allowed the low-viscosity lava to flow for large distances from the source vents. The volcanic origin of the island has led it to be dotted with holocene pyroclastic rock that can be found across the island. On the eastern and western sides of the island, tuff cones, formed from the rapid interaction of hot lava and water, are visible. The summit of the volcano is on the northwestern part of the island and the last recorded volcanic activity on Santiago Island was between 1904 and 1906.

== Wildlife ==
Like the other islands of the Galápagos archipelago, Santiago Island is rife with wildlife, particularly species endemic to the Galápagos. Some animals commonly seen on the island include the Galápagos fur seal, Galápagos sea lion, Sally Lightfoot crab, marine iguana and Galápagos land iguana, bottlenose dolphin, rice rat, and Microlophus. Charles Darwin in October 1835 noted that the island's population of land iguanas was immense: "I cannot give a more forcible proof of their numbers than by stating that when we were left at James Island we could not for some time find a spot free from their burrows on which to pitch our single tent." On the plants and vegetation, Darwin observed, "As in the other islands, the lower region was covered by nearly leafless bushes, but the trees were here of larger growth than elsewhere. The upper region, being kept damp by the clouds, supports a green and flourishing vegetation."

=== Restoration ===
The Directorate of Galápagos National Park and Island Conservation reintroduced 1,436 Galápagos Land Iguanas (Conolophus subcristatus) to Santiago Island on 4 January 2019 after a 180-year absence. The partners reintroduced the land iguanas in an effort to restore the island's ecological health and to provide the opportunity for this iguana species to thrive. Land iguanas were sourced from North Seymour Island, where they were introduced in the 1930s and have increased to over 5,000 and faced a lack of food availability. Charles Darwin was the second-last person to record land iguanas alive on Santiago Island in 1835, with Abel-Nicolas Bergasse du Petit-Thouars being the last in 1838.

== Gallery ==
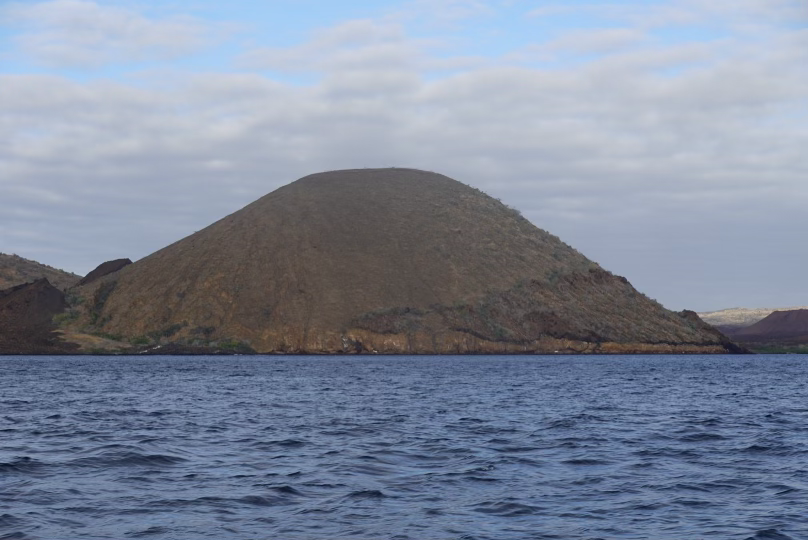
Tuff cone on the east side of the island

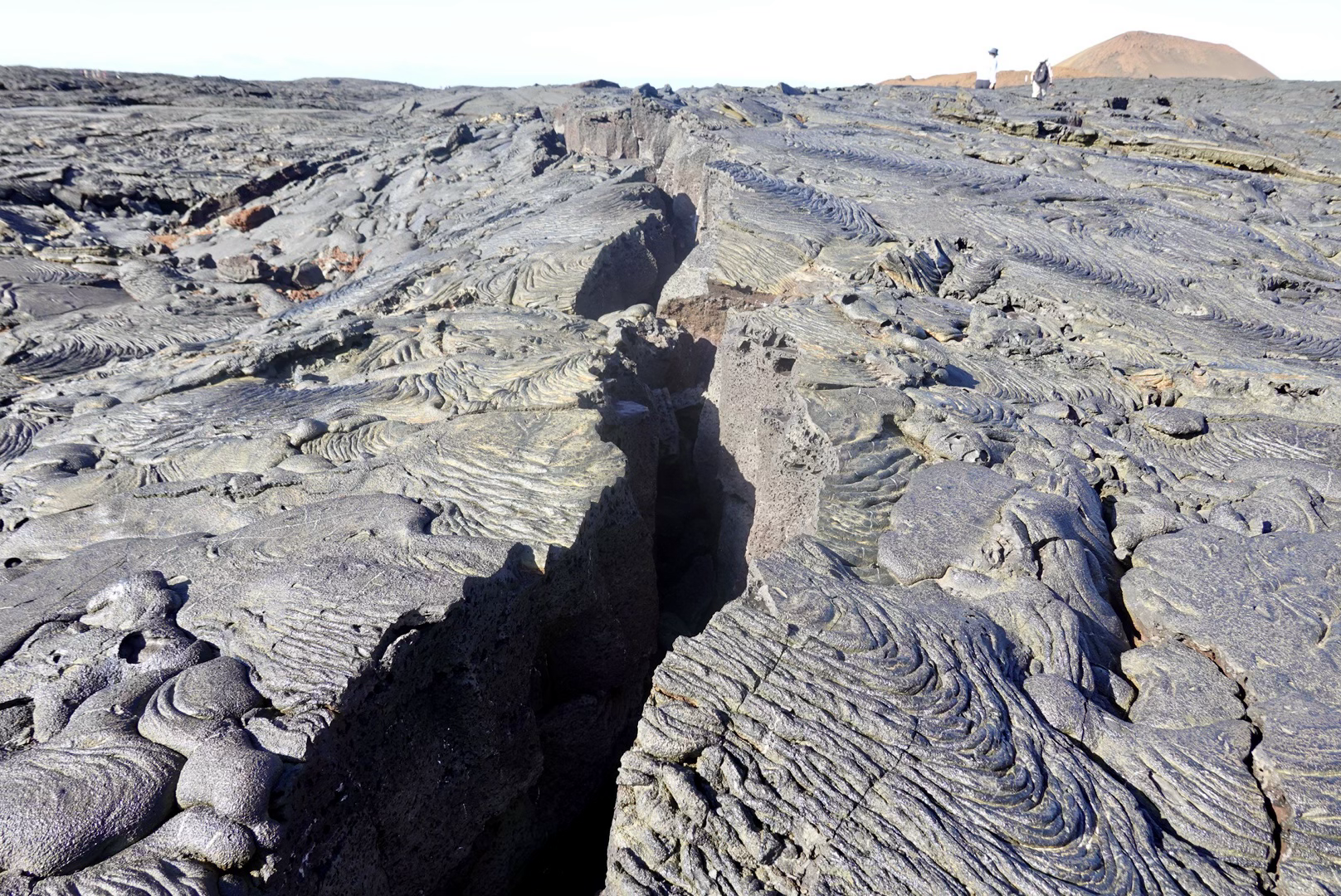
Cracked hardened lava flow on the island

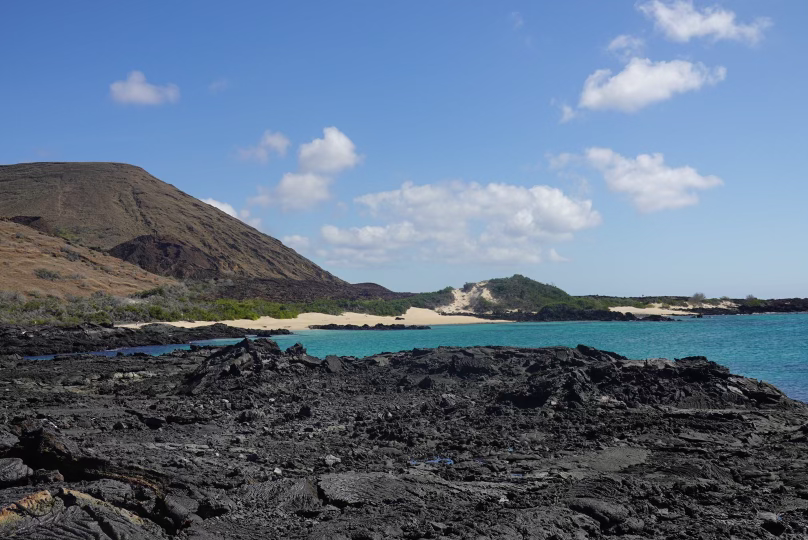
Panorama of the east side (Note the older sand & vegetation in the background and newer hardened lava in the foreground)

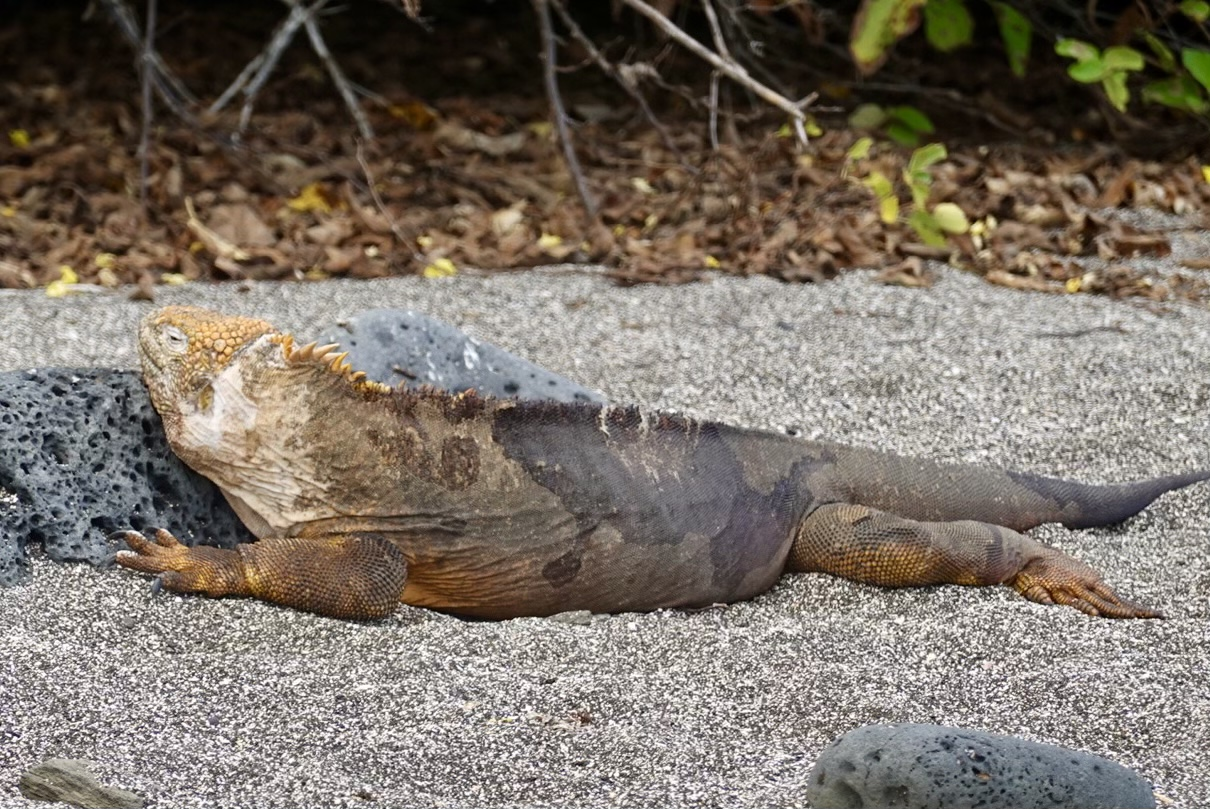
Land Iguana basking in the sun

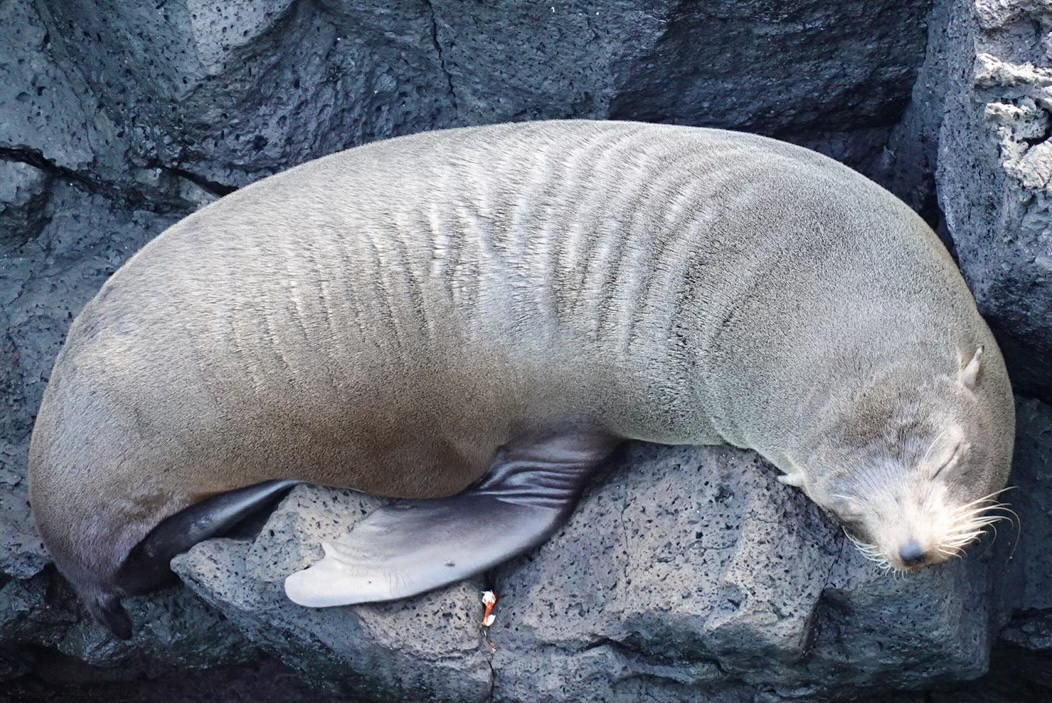
Galápagos Sea Lion napping between hardened lava formations

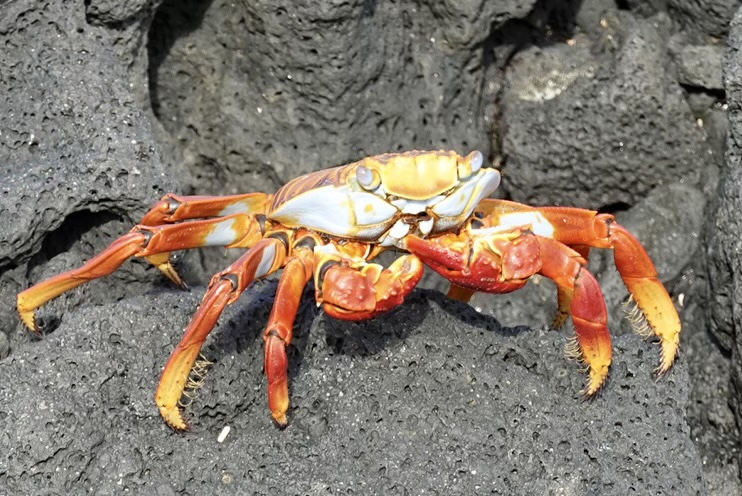
Sally Lightfoot Crab (Grapsus Grapsus) on Santiago

== See also ==
- Volcanoes of the Galápagos Islands
- Action off James Island
- Other Santiago Islands
