= Paute Dam =

- Location within Ecuador
- Location: Paute, Ecuador
- Coordinates: 02°35′10″S 78°33′30″W
- Construction began: 1976
- Opening date: 1983
- Operator: CELEC

Dam and spillways
- Type of dam: Arch-gravity dam
- Impounds: Paute River
- Length: 420 m (1,380 ft)
- Dam volume: 1,188,219 m^{3} (1,554,132 cu yd)
- Spillway type: Gate-controlled overflow
- Spillway capacity: 7,724 m^{3}/s (272,800 cu ft/s)

Reservoir
- Creates: Paute Reservoir
- Total capacity: 120×10^{6} m^{3} (97,000 acre⋅ft)
- Active capacity: 100×10^{6} m^{3} (81,000 acre⋅ft)

Power Station
- Commission date: Phase AB: 1983; Phase C: 1991
- Hydraulic head: Phase AB: 650 m (2,130 ft); Phase C: 657 m (2,156 ft)
- Turbines: Phase AB: 5 x 100 MW (130,000 hp) Pelton-type; Phase C: 5 x 115 MW (154,000 hp) Pelton-type
- Installed capacity: 1,075 MW (1,442,000 hp)

The Paute Dam, also known as the Daniel Palacios Dam and the Amaluza Dam, is a hydroelectric dam in Ecuador. It is located on the Paute River, 125 kilometres (78 mi) from Cuenca. After the privatization of power generation that began in 1996 under the government of Sixto Durán Ballén, the dam passed into the hands of the company Hidropaute SA and then returned to state ownership during the government of Rafael Correa when Hidropaute became part of the Ecuador Electricity Corporation (Corporación Eléctrica del Ecuador, CELEC).

Paute was constructed between 1976 and 1983 by Thyssenkrupp AG on the Paute River and designed on the premise that it would be erected downstream of the Mazar Dam. The Paute Dam's supports the 1,075 megawatts (1,442,000 hp) Molina Power Station. In late 2009, low water levels at the dam were the primary cause of an electricity crisis in Ecuador.

== See also ==
- List of conventional hydroelectric power stations
