= Santiago Island =

Santiago Island may refer to:

- Isla Santiago (Baja California Sur)
- Santiago Island (Cape Verde)
- Santiago Island (Galápagos)
- Santiago Island (Philippines)
