= Santiago Province =

Santiago Province may refer to:

- Santiago Province, Chile
- Santiago Province, Dominican Republic
- Santiago de Cuba Province, Cuba
- Santiago del Estero Province, Argentina
