= The Rio Times =

Brazilian English-language newspaper

- The November 2011 front page of The Rio Times
- Type: Online news and features services, and monthly printed newspaper
- Editor: Matthias Camenzind
- Founded: March 2009 (17 years, 6 months)
- Language: English
- Headquarters: Rio de Janeiro, Brazil
- Website: www.riotimesonline.com

The Rio Times is an independently owned English-language online newspaper founded in 2009. It covers news and analysis about Brazil, Latin America, and the Global South.

Based in Rio de Janeiro, Brazil, it was one of the biggest newspapers in English in all of Latin America, with a reach twice as large as the second-placed Mexico News Daily.

== Mission and coverage ==
The Rio Times is an English language publication dedicated to anyone interested in Brazil and Latin America. The paper's editor is Swiss-born Matthias Camenzind, who bought The Rio Times in March 2019 from its American founder Stone Korshak.

Beyond national and local events, The Rio Times also covers issues of specific interest to foreign nationals in Brazil. The paper's mission is to provide its readers with a broad spectrum of information and improve their understanding of Rio de Janeiro, São Paulo, Brazil, and Latin America.

In 2019, The Rio Times started to invest significantly more in reporting from all over Latin America. A third of all daily contributions today report on Latin America while two thirds deal with Brazil.

All content is written and sourced independently. The site does not republish machine translations or republish content from Portuguese-language media in Brazil.

== Online newspaper ==
The Rio Times produced its first printed version, which increased from 5,000 to 10,000 in December 2011. It is distributed to a range of hotels and places popular with the Anglophone expat community and it was printed.
