= Margaret Santiago =

- Born: 1931; Spartanburg
- Died: 17 March 2018 (aged 86–87)
- Alma mater: Carver High School
- Occupation: Singer, museum professional, registrar
- Employer: National Museum of Natural History (1991–); Smithsonian Institution
- Position held: registrar (1977–1991), supervisor (1970–1977)

Margaret Santiago (October 22, 1931 – March 17, 2018) was an American museum registrar. Santiago, who worked at the National Museum of Natural History, was the first African-American to work as a registrar for a major scientific museum, and a co-founder of the African American Museums Association (later the Association of African American Museums).

== Career ==
Santiago began working at the Smithsonian in 1960 as a clerk typist. She was promoted to assistant supervisor in accessions and specimen control at the National Museum of Natural History in 1963. By 1970, she was the supervisor of that unit. In 1977, Santiago became the first African-American to work as a registrar for any major scientific museum, a position she held until her retirement.

Santiago was a co-founder of the African American Museums Association (later the Association of African American Museums). Santiago retired from the Smithsonian in 1991, after a thirty year career.

== Personal life ==
Santiago was born in Spartanburg, South Carolina in 1931. As a young woman, she sang at Macedonia Baptist Church in Spartanburg, and on a radio program in Washington, D.C. In 1987, she released an album titled, "MarGueritte S. Soulful Gospel." (She was called MarGeuritte by friends.)

Santiago was married and had four children.

She also lived in Puerto Rico and Atlanta, GA.

Santiago died on March 17, 2018.
