= Santiago (footballer, born 1984) =

Brazilian footballer

Personal information
- Full name: Rafael Santiago Maria
- Date of birth: 10 August 1984 (age 42)
- Place of birth: Curitiba, Brazil
- Height: 1.85 m (6 ft 1 in)
- Position: Forward

Senior career*
Years	Team	Apps	(Gls)
2002–2004	Paraná		
2005	Operário (PR)		
2006	Marcílio Dias		
2006	Budapest Honvéd FC		
2007	Iraty		
2008	Rio Branco		
2008–2010	A.F.C. Tubize	10	(1)
2010	Chapecoense		
2010–2011	Esportivo		
2012–2013	Caxias do Sul	13	(3)
2013	ABC		
2013-2014	Pelotas		
- * Club domestic league appearances and goals

Rafael Santiago Maria or simply Santiago (born 10 August 1984) is a Brazilian former professional footballer who played as a forward.
