= Beja (Santiago Maior e São João Baptista) =

Beja (Uniâo das Freguesias de Santiago Maior e São João Baptista)
- Civil parish
- Location in Portugal
- Coordinates: 38.016°N 7.871°W
- Country: Portugal
- Region: Alentejo
- Intermunic. comm.: Baixo Alentejo
- District: Beja
- Municipality: Beja

Area
  - Total: 51.27 km^{2} (19.80 sq mi)

Population (2011)
  - Total: 14,015
  - Density: 273.4/km^{2} (708.0/sq mi)
- Time zone: UTC+00:00 (WET)
  - Summer (DST): UTC+01:00 (WEST)

Beja (União das Freguesias de Santiago Maior e São João Baptista) is a parish in the concelho of Beja on Beja District, Portugal. It was formed in 2013 by the merger of the former parishes Santiago Maior and São João Baptista. The population in 2011 was 14,015, in an area of 51.27 km^{2}.
