= Manuela Santiago Collazo =

Mayor of Vieques, Puerto Rico

Mayor of Vieques
- In office January 14, 1985 – 2000
- Succeeded by: Dámaso Serrano

Personal details
- Born: January 1, 1936 Vieques, Puerto Rico
- Died: December 14, 2010 (aged 64) Hato Rey, Puerto Rico
- Party: New Progressive Party (PNP)

Manuela Santiago Collazo (1936–2010) was a Puerto Rican politician who was the mayor of the city of Vieques (1985–2001).

Santiago Collazo worked as a teacher at the Eugenio María de Hostos and José Gautier Benítez schools, as well as Assistant Superintendent of the Department of Education. She became Vieques' first female mayor during the 1984 general elections. She remained in that position until 2001.

A popular politician among Vieques residents and among many mainland Puerto Rico residents as well, Santiago Collazo met with various difficult moments during her tenure as mayor: In 1989, Vieques was one of the most severely affected Puerto Rican cities after the passing of Hurricane Hugo. Large amounts of money were required to return the town to normality, as the island-city's boat service to Fajardo had to be temporarily stopped, the local airline, Vieques Air Link, suffered temporary loss of some of their aircraft, and the city lost electricity and water services. The city was later also affected by other hurricanes and storms.

In 1995, many important political figures wrote a letter to United States president Bill Clinton, asking for an investigation into an incident where an atomic bomb hit Vieques supposedly by accident in 1966. Santiago Collazo signed the letter. It could be said that this was a small beginning to what would later become mass protests by Vieques citizens against the presence of the military there. After David Sanes' death by a military bomb in 1999, the protests intensified, and, by 2003, the military left the island of Vieques.

Santiago Collazo led a campaign to attract more airlines to Vieques' small airport facility. The campaign has succeeded in part: whereas during the early 1980s only Vieques Air Link and Prinair provided service to the airport, now the airport is served by Vieques Air Link, Air Culebra and a number of other small carriers from around the rest of the Caribbean.

Manuela Santiago Collazo did not seek re-election in the 2000 General Elections.

She died on December 14, 2010, at Hospital del Maestro in Hato Rey, Puerto Rico after suffering a heart attack.

== Legacy ==
An elementary school in Vieques was named posthumously after Manuela Santiago Collazo.
