= Ramón Collazo =

Loro Collazo
- Birth name: Ramon Collazo Patalagoiti
- Born: 25 January 1901 Montevideo, Uruguay
- Died: 16 July 1981 (aged 80) Montevideo, Uruguay
- Genres: Tango, foxtrot, variety
- Occupation(s): Composer, pianist, conductor, actor
- Instrument: Piano
- Labels: RCA Victor, Odeon Records
- Formerly of: Troupe Ateniense, Troupe Oxford, Gerardo Matos Rodriguez, Victor Soliño, Alberto Vila

Ramón Collazo (January 25, 1901 – July 16, 1981) was a Tango pianist, composer, actor. was born in the now extinct Red-light district of the Barrio Sur of Montevideo, Uruguay, where his father owned a grocery. His brother Juan Antonio Collazo also was a Tango pianist and composer.

In his prolific oeuvre, there are very important titles including such standouts as: Agua florida, Golondrina, Blanca nieve, Adios Susana, Mamá, yo quiero un novio, Sevilla, Si lo supiera Mamá, San Antonio, Malvaloca, Sevilla, Portuguesa, Hombrecito, Tilin-tilon, Buenos dias, Palan, palan, Fado fadiño, Adiós mi barrio, Madrigal Veneciano, Volverás, Ay mamá, quiero casarme, Aquel Pierrot, Jacaranda, Pato, La chicharra, Qué quieren con el Charleston, Venganza, A la luz de la luna, Boquita de rosa, Ya ... ya ..., Casarme! ... Nunca, Pajarito cantor, Vieja loca, and, furthermore, he ventured in other genres: folk songs, foxtrot and maxixes.

He was also involved in several theatrical, radio, television, Carnival and movie projects and he starred in the film : Soltero soy feliz (1938).
