= Paute River =

River of Ecuador

Location
- Country: Ecuador

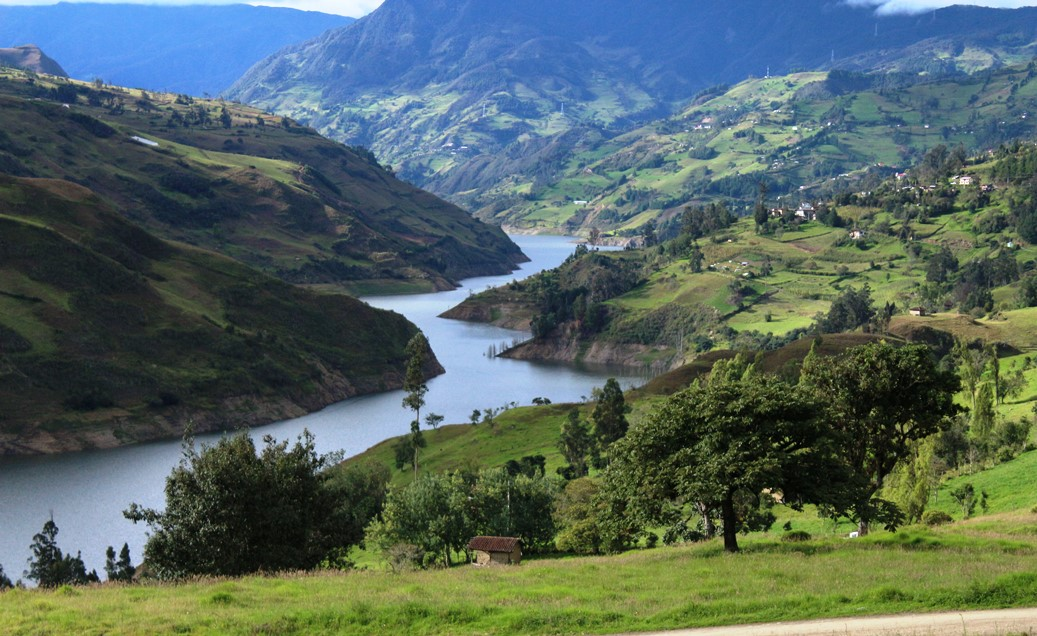
Mazar Reservoir: Reservoir formed by the Mazar dam, part of the Paute Integral hydroelectric complex, in the northeastern area of the province of Azuay

The Paute River is a river of Ecuador. It is a tributary of the Santiago River, which is a tributary of the Amazon River. The Paute Dam is located on the river.

== See also ==
- List of rivers of Ecuador
