= Nova Southeastern University =

Private university in Fort Lauderdale-Davie, Florida, U.S.

- Former name: List: Nova University of Advanced Technology (1964–1974) Nova University (1974–1994) Southeastern College of Osteopathic Medicine (1981–1986) Southeastern University of the Health Sciences (1986–1994)
- Type: Private research university
- Established: December 4, 1964; 61 years ago
- Accreditation: SACS
- Academic affiliations: ICUF; NAICU; sea-grant
- Endowment: $252.1 million (2024)
- Budget: $590 million (2019)
- Chancellor: Ray F. Ferrero Jr.
- President: Harry Moon
- Provost: Ronald Chenail
- Academic staff: 922 full-time, 827 part-time (fall 2023)
- Students: 20,877 (fall 2023)
- Undergraduates: 7,219 (fall 2023)
- Postgraduates: 13,658 (fall 2023)
- Location: Fort Lauderdale–Davie, Florida, United States; 26°4′40″N 80°14′31″W
- Campus: 314 acres (127 ha); Large suburb
- Other campuses: Dania Beach; Denver-Centennial; Fort Myers; Jacksonville; Miramar; Las Vegas-Henderson; Miami-Kendall; Orlando; Palm Beach Gardens; San Juan; Tampa-Clearwater; Online
- Newspaper: The Current
- Colors: Navy blue and gray
- Nickname: Sharks
- Sporting affiliations: NCAA Division II – Sunshine State
- Mascot: Razor the Shortfin Mako Shark
- Website: www.nova.edu

Nova Southeastern University (NSU) is a private research university in Florida with its main campus in Fort Lauderdale, Florida, United States. The university consists of 12 colleges, offering over 130 academic degree programs at the undergraduate, graduate, and doctoral/professional levels. The university offers graduate and professional degrees in the social sciences, law, business, osteopathic medicine, allopathic medicine, health sciences, pharmacy, dentistry, optometry, physical therapy, education, occupational therapy, and nursing.

As of 2024, more than 20,000 students were enrolled at Nova Southeastern University, and as of 2025, the university had 220,000+ alumni. NSU's main campus, located on 314 acres (127 hectares) is in the greater Fort Lauderdale area of Florida. The university also operates additional campuses in the Dania Beach–Hollywood area and the Tampa Bay–Clearwater area, as well as locations throughout the state of Florida, in the states of Colorado and Nevada, and in San Juan, Puerto Rico. Also, some courses are offered entirely online.

The university was founded in 1964 as the Nova University of Advanced Technology on a former naval outlying landing field built during World War II and first offered graduate degrees in the physical and social sciences. In 1994, the university merged with the Southeastern University of the Health Sciences and assumed its current name.

Nova Southeastern is accredited by the Southern Association of Colleges and Schools and also has numerous additional specialized accreditations for its colleges and programs. It is classified among "R1: Doctoral Universities – Very High research activity" and as a "community engaged" university.

== History ==
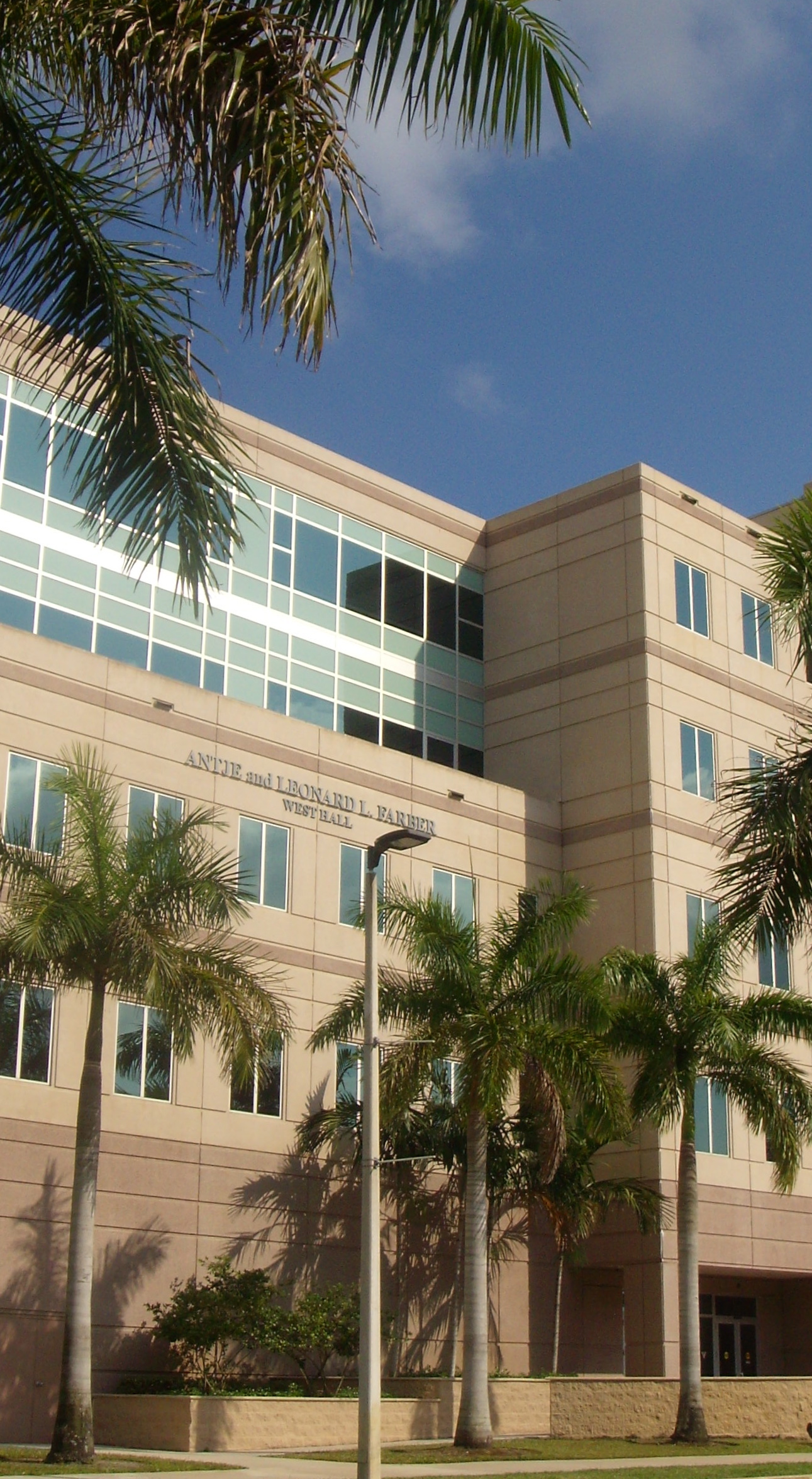
Farber West Hall

=== 1960s ===
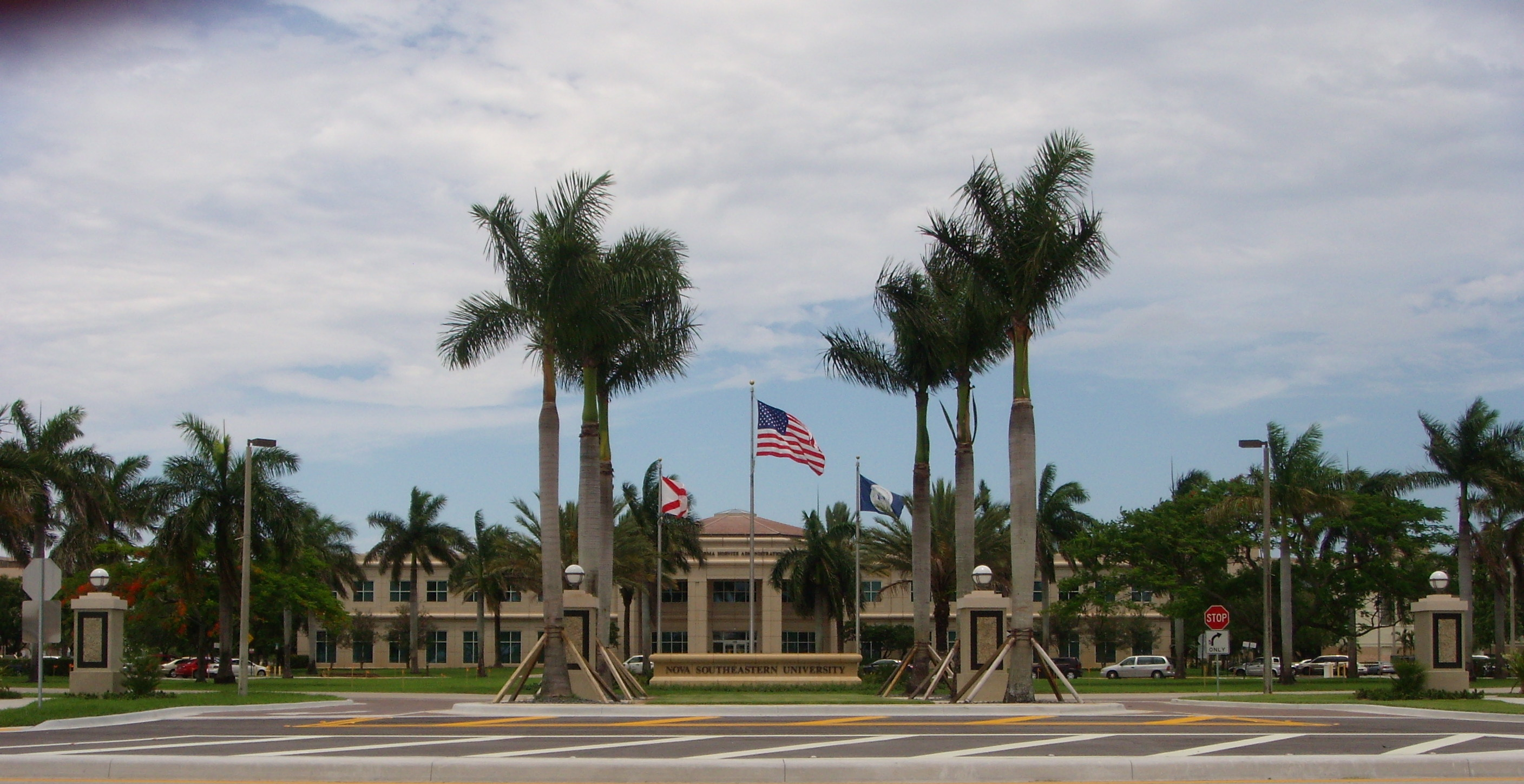
Main entrance of NSU

The university, originally named Nova University of Advanced Technology, was chartered by the state of Florida on December 4, 1964. The name comes from the site where the Nova Education Experiment was conducted, a project funded in part by the Ford Foundation and the federal government with the goal of creating a series of schools spanning elementary to university-level education. With an inaugural class of 17 students, the university opened as a graduate school for the social and physical sciences. The university was originally located on a campus in downtown Fort Lauderdale but later moved to its current campus in Davie, Florida. A portion of the site of this campus was once a naval training airfield during World War II, called the "Naval Outlying Landing Field Forman". The remnants of the taxiway surrounding the airfield are still present in the form of roads used on the campus. After World War II, the federal government made a commitment to the Forman family, from whom the land was purchased, that the land would only be used for educational purposes. This led the land to be used for the creation of the South Florida Education Center, which includes Nova Southeastern University, as well as Broward College, McFatter Technical College, and satellite campuses of Florida Atlantic University and the University of Florida.

=== 1970s ===
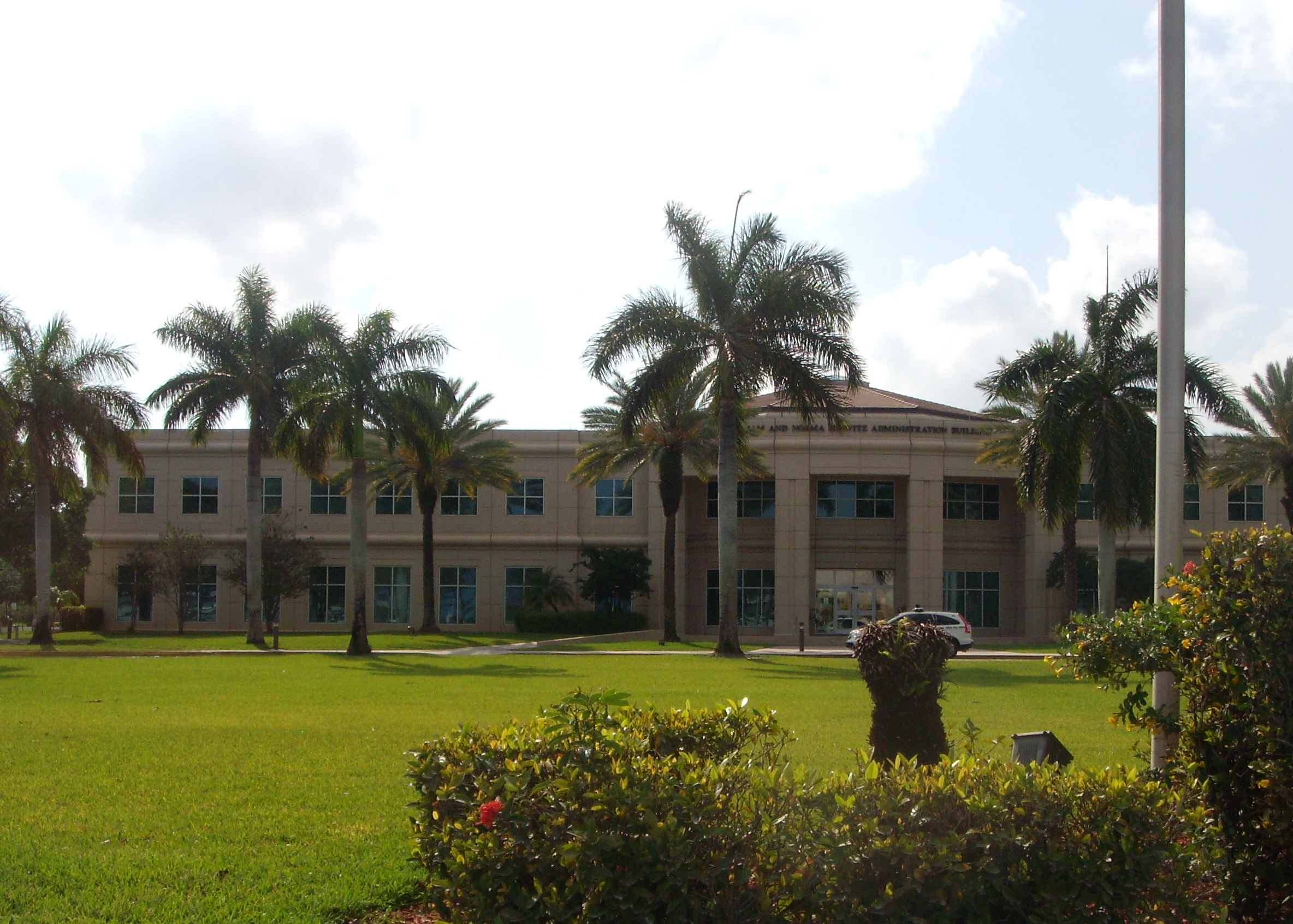
Front of Horvitz building

On June 23, 1970, the board of trustees voted to enter into a federation with the New York Institute of Technology (NYIT). The president of NYIT, Alexander Schure, PhD, became chancellor of Nova University, and Abraham S. Fischler became the president of the university. The university charter was amended and "of Advanced Technology" was dropped from its corporate name. In 1971, Nova University received accreditation from the Southern Association of Colleges and Schools (SACS).

In 1972, the university introduced its first off-campus course of study in education. In 1974, NSU opened a law school, with an inaugural class of 175 students. The law school was named after one of the university's founders, Shepard Broad. The same year, the university began offering evening courses on campus for undergraduates, and changed its name to Nova University. The following year, in 1975, the law school received approval from the American Bar Association.

=== 1980s ===
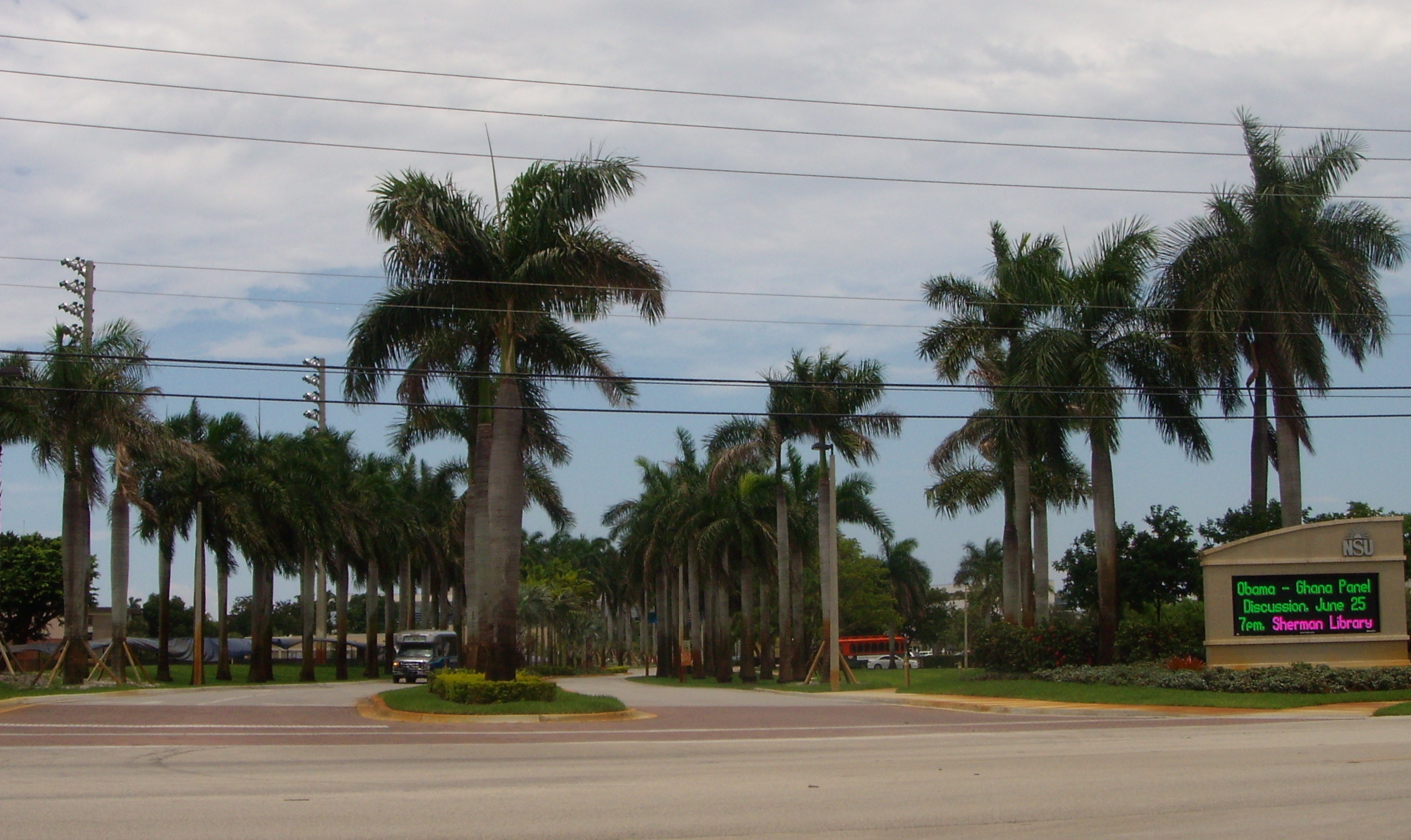
South entrance of NSU

In the early 1980s, the university received a $16 million gift from the Leo Goodwin Sr. Trust. In 1985, NSU ended its collaboration with NYIT and began offering its first online classes. In 1989, enrollment reached 8,000 students, with nearly 25,000 alumni.

In 1981, outside of Nova University, a group of osteopathic physicians, wanting to enhance medical education in the region, established the Southeastern College of Osteopathic Medicine in North Miami Beach. This was the first osteopathic medical school established in the southeastern United States.

Rapid expansion over the course of the decade also resulted in the addition of several new programs at Southeastern College. Pharmacy and optometry, amongst other programs, were added to the school. The school then renamed itself into the Southeastern University of the Health Sciences.

=== 1990s ===
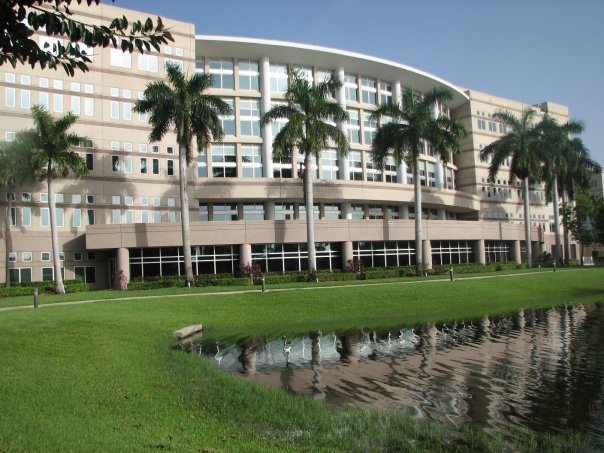
Morton & Geraldine Terry Atrium

During the 1990s, both Nova University and Southeastern University expanded, adding a dentistry program and increasing distance education programs. In 1994, Nova University merged with Southeastern University of the Health Sciences to form Nova Southeastern University (NSU), adding the colleges of osteopathic medicine, pharmacy, optometry and allied health to the university. Following the merger, many of the health programs relocated to their current location on the Davie campus. In 1993, the Miami Dolphins opened a training center on campus.

=== 2000s ===
The William and Norma Horvitz Administration Building, a two-story 62,000-square-foot (5,800 m^{2}) postmodern structure, was built at a cost of $3 million, which houses the office of the president and numerous other administration departments. In 2001, the Alvin Sherman Library for Research and Information Technology Center was completed and also serves as the largest public library facility in the state of Florida. In 2004, the Carl DeSantis Building opened, housing the H. Wayne Huizenga School of Business and Entrepreneurship. The building is a 261,000-square-foot (24,200 m^{2}), five-story facility, and cost about $33 million.

In 2006, the 344,600-square-foot (32,010 m^{2}) University Center opened, which includes a 5,400-seat arena, a fitness center, a performance theater, art gallery, a food court, and a student lounge. Five residence halls on the main campus serve undergraduate, graduate, health professions, and law students, with a capacity for housing 720 students in approximately 207,000 square feet (19,200 m^{2}) of living space. In 2007, a 501-bed residence hall called "The Commons" opened.

The university attracted negative attention in 2006 when it ended a contract with subcontractor UNICCO after more than 350 of its employees, almost all of them minorities, opted to unionize with SEIU; the university's action contrasted with the reactions of the administrations of other south Florida universities to the organization of their janitorial staff.

In 2008, NSU, in partnership with the National Coral Reef Institute and the International Coral Reef Symposium, held the largest coral reef symposium in the world, which included representation from 75 countries in attendance. In 2008, the Museum of Art Fort Lauderdale joined the university. Originally founded in 1986 and located in Fort Lauderdale, the museum focuses on contemporary art work, particularly of the cultures of South Florida and Latin America. The NSU Art Museum is based in a 83,000 square-foot building, with a 256-seat auditorium and permanent collection of more than 7,000 works.

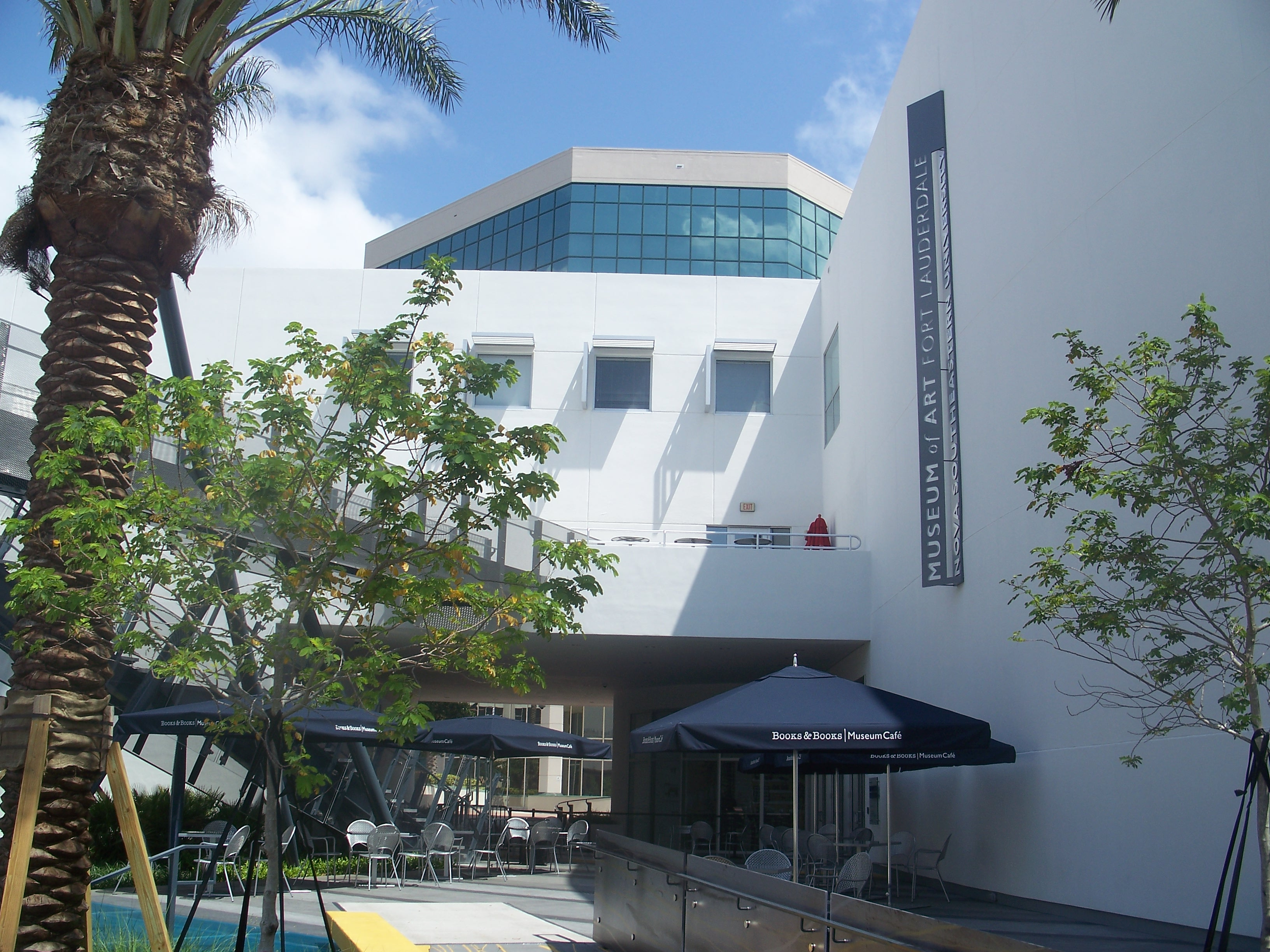
NSU Art Museum

=== 2010s ===
George L. Hanbury II was the sixth president of Nova Southeastern University, assuming the position of president in January 2010.

In 2014, NSU opened a new campus in Puerto Rico, with master and doctoral programs. In April 2015, NSU announced a significant restructuring of its schools and colleges, adopting an all-college framework, to take effect the following July. Two new colleges were established: the Dr. Kiran C. Patel College of Allopathic Medicine and the Farquhar Honors College. The inaugural class of the medical school consisted of 53 students, with courses commencing on July 30, 2018. The college became South Florida's fourth traditional (allopathic) medical school.

In January 2019, the university opened the NSU Write from the Start Writing and Communication Center in the Alvin Sherman Library on the main campus in Davie. The center offers writing and communication assistance to all NSU students as part of the university's Quality Enhancement Plan, which is part of reaccreditation through the Southern Association of Colleges and Schools Commission on Colleges.

Following a $50 million donation from the Kiran C Patel Foundation, NSU's Tampa Bay campus was relocated to Clearwater. It now houses the second DO degree program, which accepted its first class in fall 2019, along with several additional allied health programs.

=== 2020s ===
The Alan B. Levan NSU Broward Center of Innovation opened in July 2021. The $20 million center occupies 54,000 ft^{2} (5,000 m^{2}) on the fifth floor of NSU's Alvin Sherman Library.

In March 2020, NSU received criticism for hosting 150 visitors on campus during the COVID-19 pandemic, despite known cases of confirmed COVID-19 on campus at the time. Two weeks prior, six cases were identified in individuals who traveled to Ireland as part of a school-affiliated trip.

In July 2020, the U.S. Department of Labor Office of Federal Contract Compliance Programs found more than 80 women were subject to pay disparities compared with male colleagues; the university agreed to pay $900,000 in back pay.

Harry Moon became the seventh president of the university in January 2025.

== Academics ==
Through its 14 colleges, the university awards associate, bachelor's, master's, doctoral, and professional degrees. The university offers 37 degrees at the doctoral level, and master's degrees are offered in 58 subjects. About 264 programs of study are offered, with more than 250 undergraduate majors.

Several degrees are offered online.

The university also houses NSU University School, a fully accredited, independent, college preparatory school that serves students in pre-kindergarten through grade 12.

=== Health Professions Division ===
NSU maintains a Health Professions Division, currently composed of seven colleges, including two accredited medical schools. The College of Osteopathic Medicine operates the Institute for Disaster and Emergency Preparedness, which is one of six training centers in the US funded by the Health Resources and Services Administration. Through the respective colleges, residency training is offered in medicine, dentistry and optometry.

NSU is one of three U.S. universities offering both M.D. and D. O. medical programs. NSU produces more health care providers with terminal degrees than any other university in the U.S. (counting all D.O.s, M.D.s, D.M.D.s, O.D.s, PharmDs). NSU is the top provider of physicians in Florida (counting D.O.s, M.D.s only; more than double that of University of Miami, which is second in Florida). NSU is among the top 5 U.S. universities graduating the most physicians (counting D.O.s, M.D.s only).

=== Institutes and centers ===
In addition to its colleges, NSU houses the following research, service, and clinical centers and institutes.

- Alan B. Levan | NSU Broward Center of Innovation (Levan Center)
- Center for Collaborative Research
- Guy Harvey Research Institute
- Institute for Disaster and Emergency Preparedness
- Institute for Neuro-Immune Medicine
- Jim & Jan Moran Family Center Village
- Lifelong Learning Institute
- Mailman Segal Institute for Early Childhood Studies (programs for families on parenting, preschool, primary education, and secondary education)
- National Coral Reef Institute

== Campuses ==
Nova Southeastern University has a main campus located in Davie, Florida, with several branch campuses throughout the state, and one in Puerto Rico.

=== Fort Lauderdale/Davie campus ===
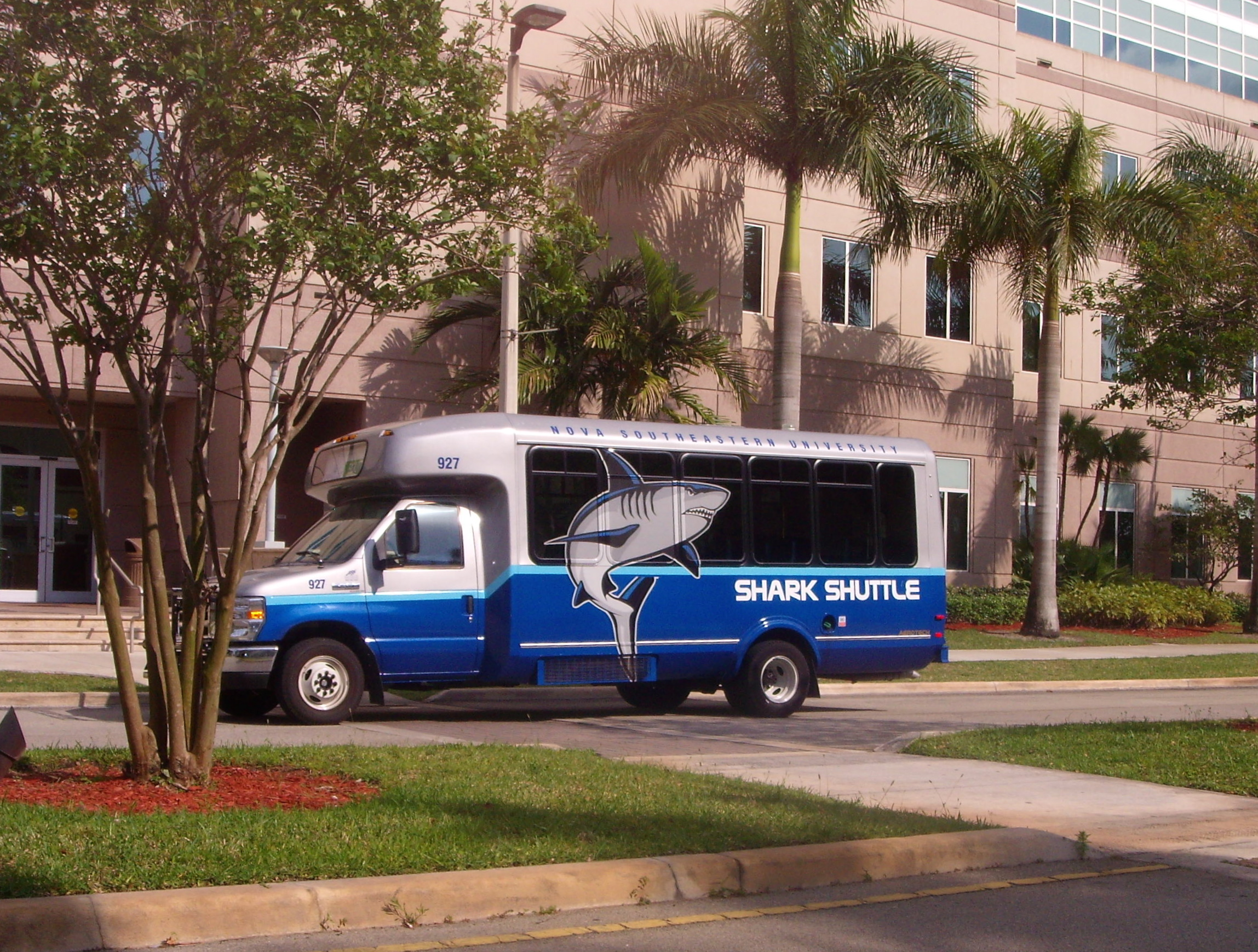
Shark Shuttle has services both on campus and between campuses.

The main campus consists of 314 acres (127 hectares) and is located in Davie, Florida. The main campus includes administrative offices, classroom facilities, library facilities (including the Alvin Sherman Library), health clinics, mental health clinics, Don Taft University Center, residence halls, cafeterias, computer labs, the bookstore, athletic facilities, and parking facilities. The Alvin Sherman Library, Research, and Information Technology Center was opened to the public in December 2001, and offers workshops on a variety of topics each semester online and at NSU campuses. The Halmos College of Arts and Sciences operates at both the main campus and an additional campus at the entrance to Port Everglades.

The campus is home to both the College of Osteopathic Medicine, which confers the Doctor of Osteopathic Medicine (D.O.) degree, and the College of Allopathic Medicine, which confers the Doctor of Medicine (M.D.) degree. This makes Nova Southeastern University the first institution in the Southeast to grant both M.D. and D.O. medical degrees.

In 2016, the Collaborative Research opened in a 215,000-square-foot (20,000 m^{2}) facility. In 2018, construction began on a 500-600 unit undergraduate residence with an additional parkade structure on campus. The College of Psychology and the College of Arts, Humanities and Social Sciences are based in the Maltz building on the Davie campus.

In 2021, HCA Florida University Hospital, along with a new medical office building and a new parking structure, opened adjacent to the main campus.

==== NSU University School ====
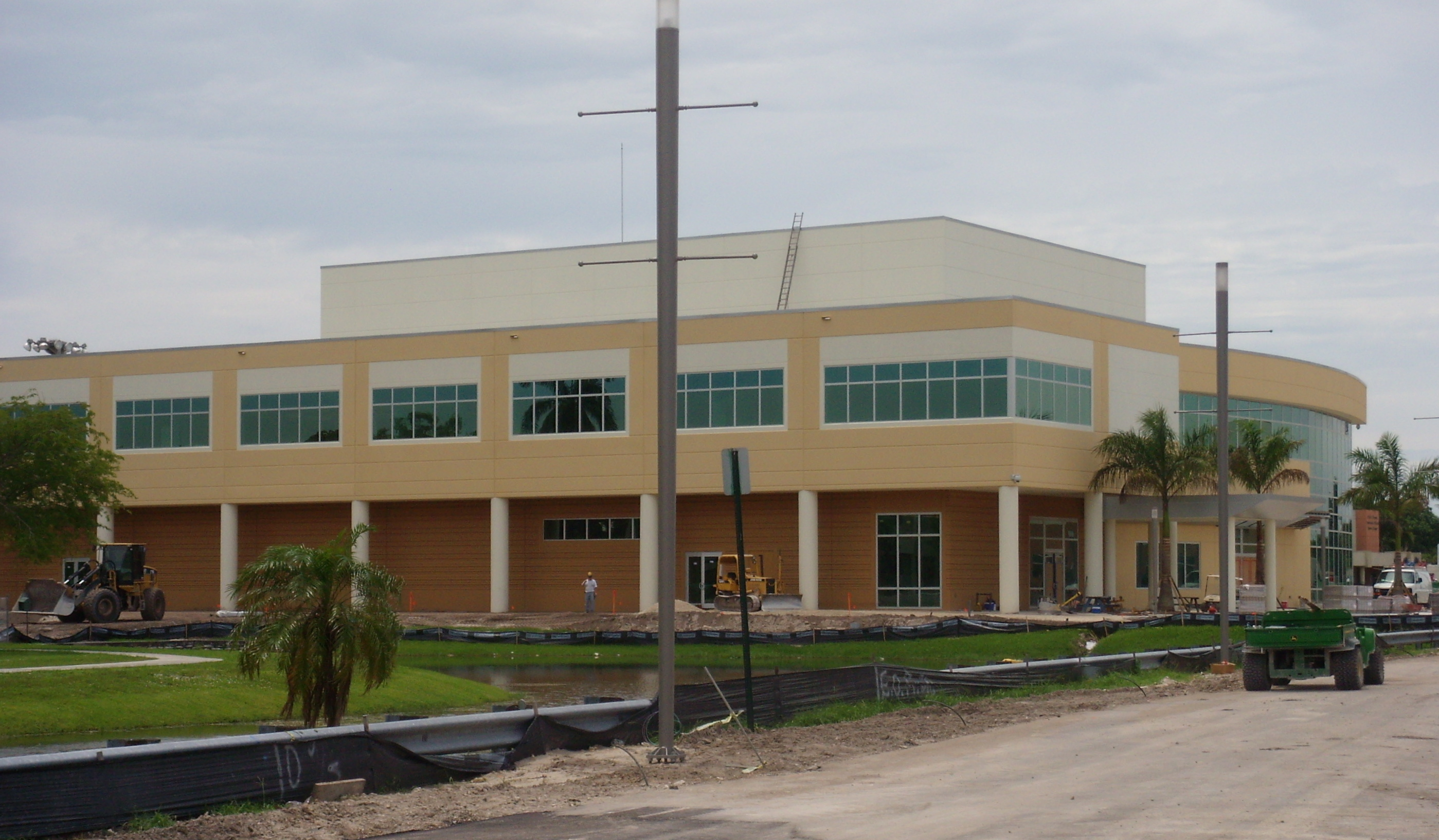
University School Arts building

The main campus hosts NSU University School. University School is a fully accredited, independent, college preparatory school that serves grades pre-kindergarten through grade 12, and is located on the Davie campus. This school, often referred to as just "University School", is organized into three academic sections: Lower, Middle, and Upper schools. These represent, respectively, elementary, middle and high school divisions within the school.

=== Dania Beach Oceanographic campus ===
The Dania Beach campus is located on 10 acres (4.0 hectares) in the Dr. Von D. Mizell-Eula Johnson State Park and houses the NSU Guy Harvey Oceanographic Center. The Dania Beach campus includes the Center of Excellence for Coral Reef Ecosystems Research. Completed in 2012 at a cost of US$50 million, the center is the largest research facility dedicated to studying coral reefs in the United States.

=== North Miami Beach campus ===
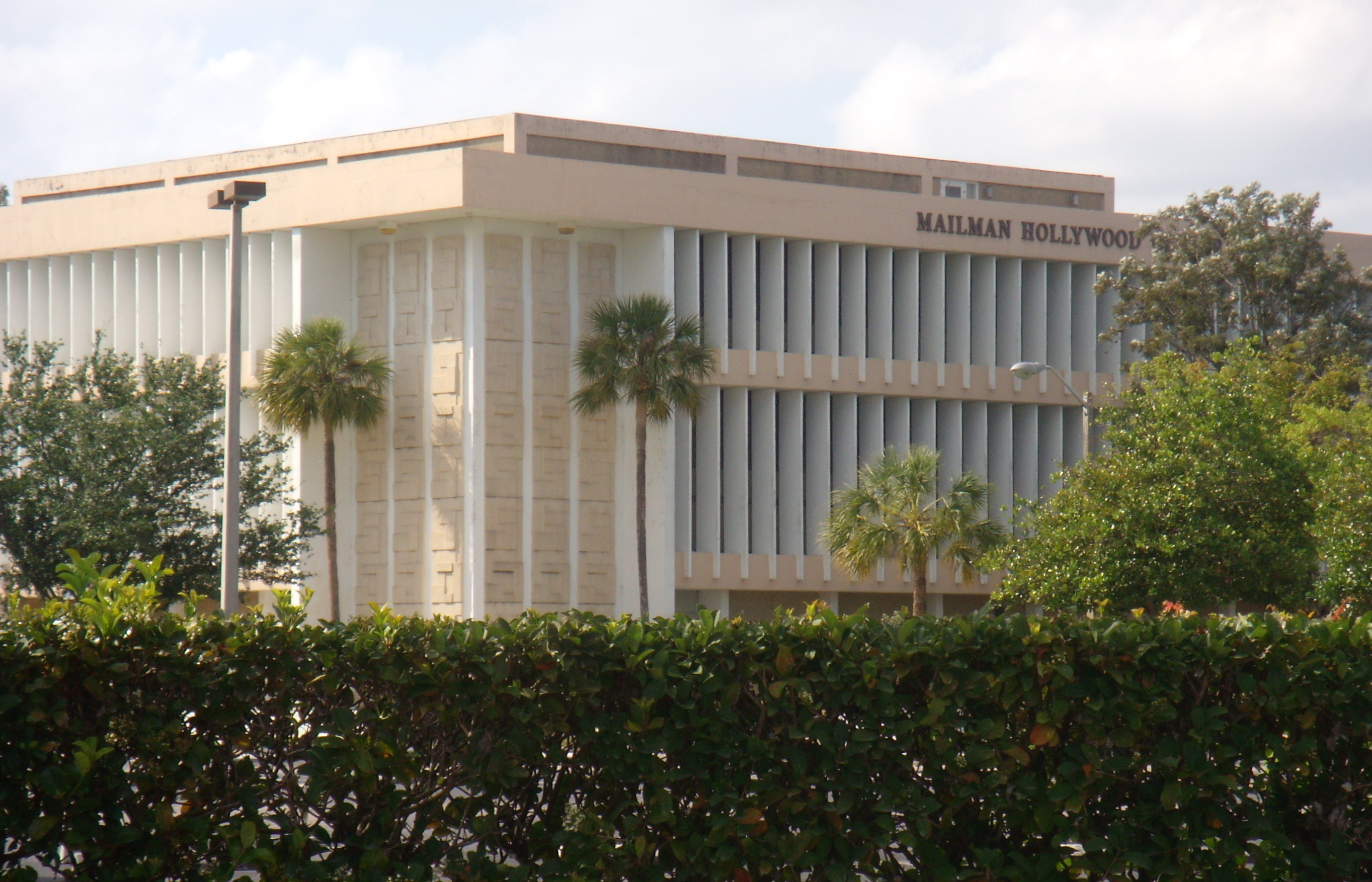
Mailman–Hollywood Building

The North Miami Beach campus, also known as the Southern campus, is located on 18 acres (7.3 hectares) and serves as the main location for the Abraham S. Fischler College of Education. The College of Education is named after Abraham S. Fischler, who served as the second president of Nova University (prior to merging with Southeastern University). The Special Needs Dentistry Clinic moved to the North Miami Beach campus in 2013.

=== Tampa Bay regional campus ===
The Tampa Bay regional campus is a newly constructed 27-acre (11 ha), 325,000-square-foot (30,200 m^{2}) campus located in Clearwater, Florida. Construction began in March 2018 and was completed in August 2019. The Drs. Kiran and Pallavi Patel Family Foundation committed to a $200 million donation to support the development of the campus. The former Tampa Bay regional campus was previously located in Brandon, Florida. Approximately 1,200 students will be registered for classes during the Fall 2019 semester. The university expressed plans to offer additional programs at the Tampa Bay campus, including osteopathic medicine, anesthesiologist assistant, occupational therapy, physical therapy, and nursing.

=== Student education centers ===
NSU operates student education centers and satellite campuses in Fort Myers, Jacksonville, Miramar, Miami-Kendall Orlando, Palm Beach-Palm Beach Gardens, Tampa Bay-Clearwater, and San Juan, Puerto Rico. These centers provide computer labs, videoconferencing equipment, and other resources for distance students, who are not located near the main campus.

=== Rankings ===
Academic rankings

National
- U.S. News & World Report: 231
- Washington Monthly: 374
- WSJ/College Pulse: 401-500

Global
- QS: 1401
- THE: 1201-1500
- U.S. News & World Report: 1414

National program rankings
Program	Ranking
Audiology	60
Clinical Psychology	167
Computer Science	186
Education	196-255
Law	148-194
Law: Part-Time	49
Medicine: Primary Care	94-122 (DO); Unranked (MD)
Medicine: Research	94-122 (DO); Unranked (MD)
Nursing: Master's	179-236
Nursing: Doctor of Nursing Practice	Unranked
Occupational Therapy	42 (Fort Lauderdale-Davie); 68 (Tampa-Clearwater)
Pharmacy	79
Physical Therapy	102
Physician Assistant	74 (Fort Lauderdale-Davie); 93 (Fort Myers); 93 (Orlando); 108 (Jacksonville)
Psychology	211
Public Affairs	243
Public Health	127
Speech-Language Pathology	213

Global program rankings
Program	Ranking
Clinical Medicine	320

In 2015, NSU was ranked by The Economist at 290 of 1,275 colleges based on income of graduate, compared to expected income. In 2015, NSU was ranked 9th for diversity by U.S. News & World Report. In 2016, NSU was selected as one of 20 global universities by the Times Higher Education and World University that could challenge the elite and become a world renowned university by 2030. In 2019, NSU ranked 22nd in number of professional doctoral degrees awarded to minorities in the US. In 2000 and in 2014, Nova Southeastern University was ranked third for highest total debt burden amongst its students.

== Student life ==
NSU undergraduate demographics
	Students
Asian	12%
Black/African American	15%
Hispanic/Latino	34%
Two or more	3%
White/non-Hispanic	28%
Unknown	3%
Non-resident alien	6%

In Fall 2024, 20,910 students were attending Nova Southeastern University, including undergraduates, graduate students, and professional programs. About 71% of undergraduate students are female, and 29% are male. The average student age is 22 years, and 25% are from out of state, while the remaining 75% of students are from Florida. About 49% of students attend classes at the Davie Campus, whereas 30% attend class at other campuses and 21% take courses online. The North Miami Beach Campus accounts for about 5% of the student population.

The university is a designated Hispanic-serving institution, a federal grant program for institutions whose student body is at least 25% Hispanic/Latino.

=== Student organizations ===
There are a total of 20 student government associations that form PanSGA with the addition of the College of Allopathic Medicine. The Nova Southeastern University's Undergraduate Student Government Association is the primary organization for the government of the undergraduate student body. There are five fraternities and seven sororities on the campus.

=== Student-run media ===
NSU's student-run newspaper, The Current, is published weekly. The school-sponsored, student-run radio station, "WNSU Radio X", broadcasts in the evenings and weekends on 88.5 FM WKPX, a station owned by Broward County Public Schools. Radio X was established in 1990 and began broadcasting over WKPX in 1998. Sharks United Television (SUTV) is a student-run media outlet at NSU. NSU University School hosts WUTV, a live news broadcast channel produced by the school's fifth-grade students and broadcast to the Lower School.

=== Student housing ===
NSU residence halls	Year built	Students
The Commons	2007	501
Cultural Living Center	1984	125
Farquhar Hall	NA	55
Founders Hall	NA	55
Leo Goodwin, Sr. Hall	1992	292
Mako Hall	2019	606
Rolling Hills Apartments	2008	373
University Pointe		
Vettel Hall	NA	55
Total	-	2,135

About 26% of students at NSU live in university owned or operated housing. Rolling Hills Apartments is a renovated residence hall that was originally the "Best Western Rolling Hills Resort." This residence hall is for graduate and doctoral students. The oldest dorms, Farquhar, Founders, and Vettel, each house 55 students and were named in 1975 for founders of Nova University. Opened in August 2019, Mako Hall holds apartment style living accommodations with individual kitchen, bedroom, and bathroom on campus.

=== Speakers series ===
Several events have been established that allow students and, in some cases, community members to listen to speakers brought in from outside the campus.

The Distinguished Lecture Series offered by NSU's Huizenga College of Business and Entrepreneurship provides students, faculty, and interested members of the business community the opportunity to get a glimpse into the minds of distinguished lecturers. Past lecturers include Angelo Elia, Jack Welch, Larry Bossidy, The Honorable Clarence Thomas, Robert L. Johnson, Alan Potamkin, Ronald Bergeron, Stephen A. Ross, Ph.D., and H. Wayne Huizenga.

The Life 101 series brings leaders from business, entertainment, politics and athletics to Nova Southeastern University to share their life accomplishments and "life lessons" learned. Past speakers include Dwayne Johnson, Wayne Huizenga, Vanessa L. Williams, Dan Abrams, Jason Taylor, Michael Phelps, James Earl Jones, and Alyssa Milano.

From 2003 to 2018, the Farquhar Honors College hosted the Distinguished Speakers Series, which brought experts and notable persons from diverse fields to the campus. Speakers included Salman Rushdie, Prime Minister Ehud Barak, Spike Lee, Maziar Bahari, Bob Woodward, Elie Wiesel, Paul Bremer, Dr. Jack Kevorkian, Desmond Tutu, and Tenzin Gyatso, The 14th Dalai Lama.

== Athletics ==
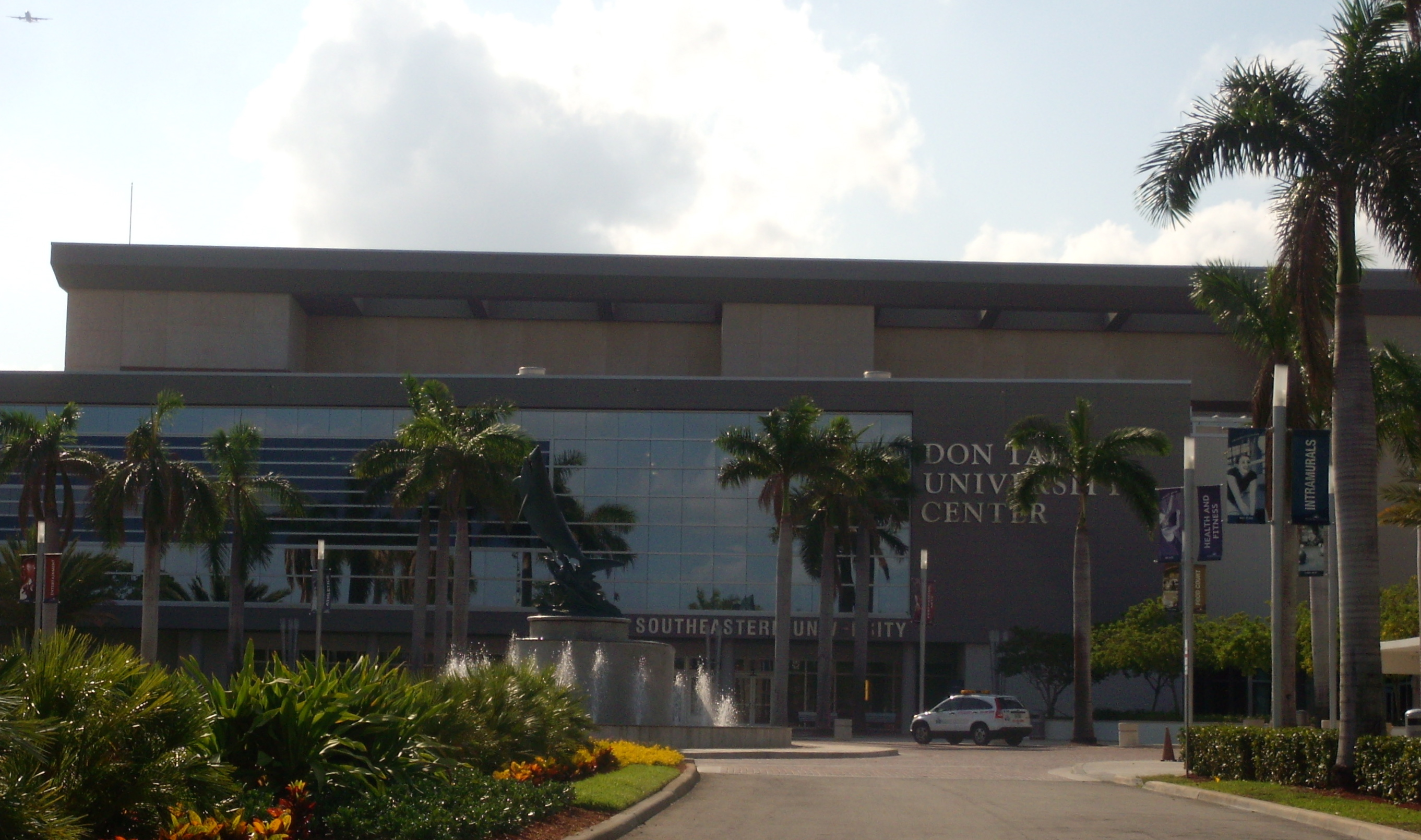
The Don Taft University Center

The Nova Southeastern University athletic teams are called the Sharks. Before 2005, NSU's athletic teams had been known as the Knights. The university is a member of the NCAA Division II ranks, primarily competing in the Sunshine State Conference (SSC) since the 2002–03 academic year. The Sharks previously competed in the Florida Sun Conference (FSC; now currently known as the Sun Conference since the 2008–09 school year) of the National Association of Intercollegiate Athletics (NAIA) from 1990–91 to 2001–02.

NSU competes in 17 intercollegiate varsity sports: Men's sports include baseball, basketball, cross country, golf, soccer, swimming & diving and track & field; women's sports include basketball, cross country, golf, rowing, soccer, softball, swimming & diving, tennis, track & field and volleyball.

Many athletic events take place at the NSU Don Taft University Center Arena.

=== Accomplishments ===
Since joining the NCAA in 2002, the NSU Sharks have produced several NCAA All-Region selections and NCAA All-Americans, and have been nationally ranked in numerous sports. The Sharks have won 17 NCAA national championships, including clinching the 2023 Men's Basketball NCAA Division II Championship. The NSU Sharks have won four straight championships in women's golf from 2009 to 2012 and did the same in women's swimming from 2023 to 2026. In 2016, for the first time in school history, the NSU baseball team won the Division II National Championship.

== Notable alumni ==
NSU has produced over 216,000 alumni from all 50 US states and over 115 countries worldwide. Alumni work in various fields, including academia, government, research, and professional sports. Prominent alumni include Major League Baseball player J.D. Martinez of the Boston Red Sox; Isabel Saint Malo, the former vice president of Panama; Ivy Dumont, first female governor-general of the Bahamas; Tyler Cymet, internist; Cathy Areu, author and journalist; Somy Ali, former Bollywood actress and activist; Geisha Williams, former CEO of PG&E; Kristine Lefebvre, lawyer and contestant on The Apprentice; Scott W. Rothstein, lawyer; Syra Madad, epidemiologist and infectious disease control expert; and Dr. Will Kirby, dermatologist and television personality.

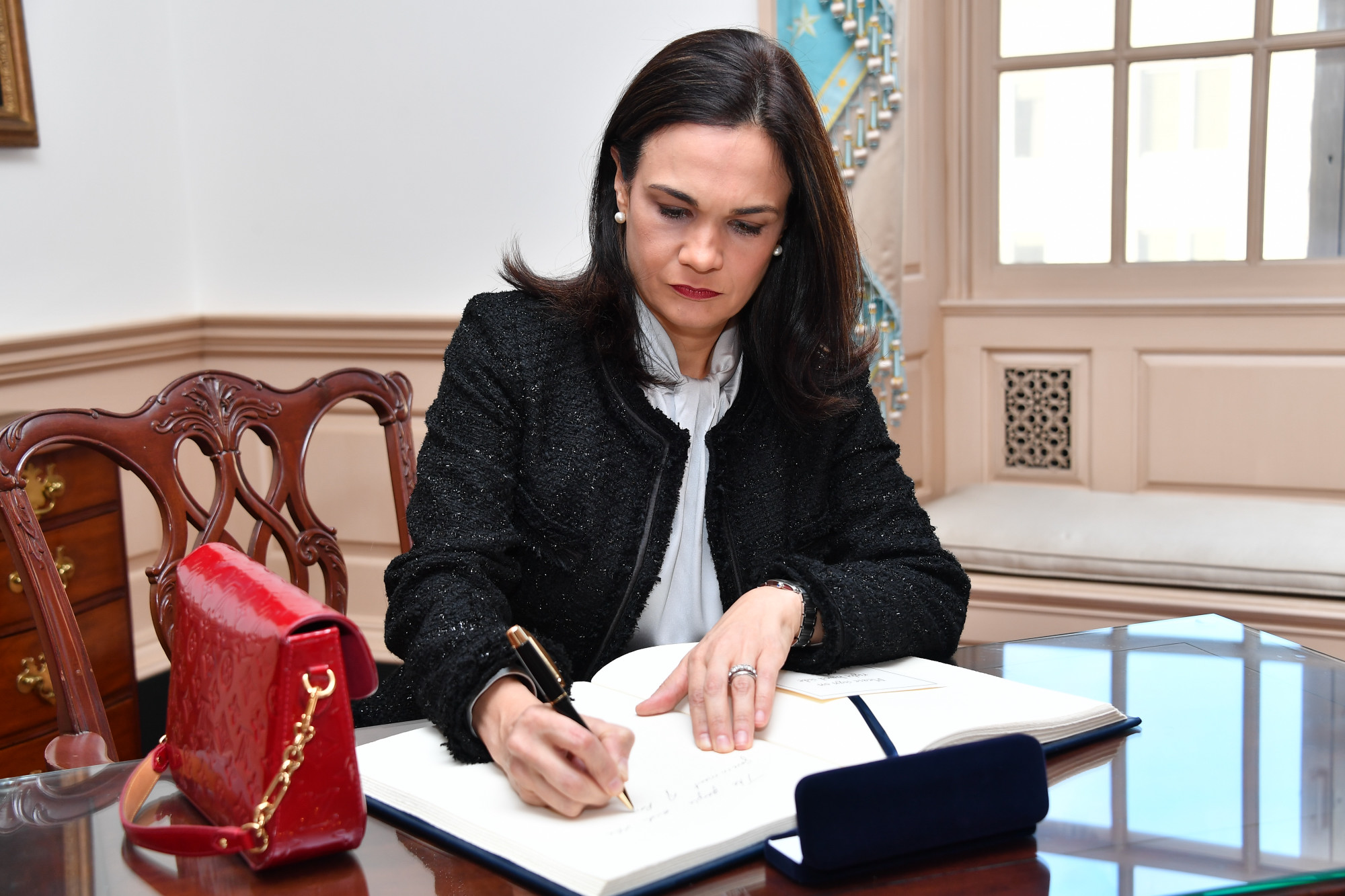
Isabel Saint Malo, former vice president of Panama

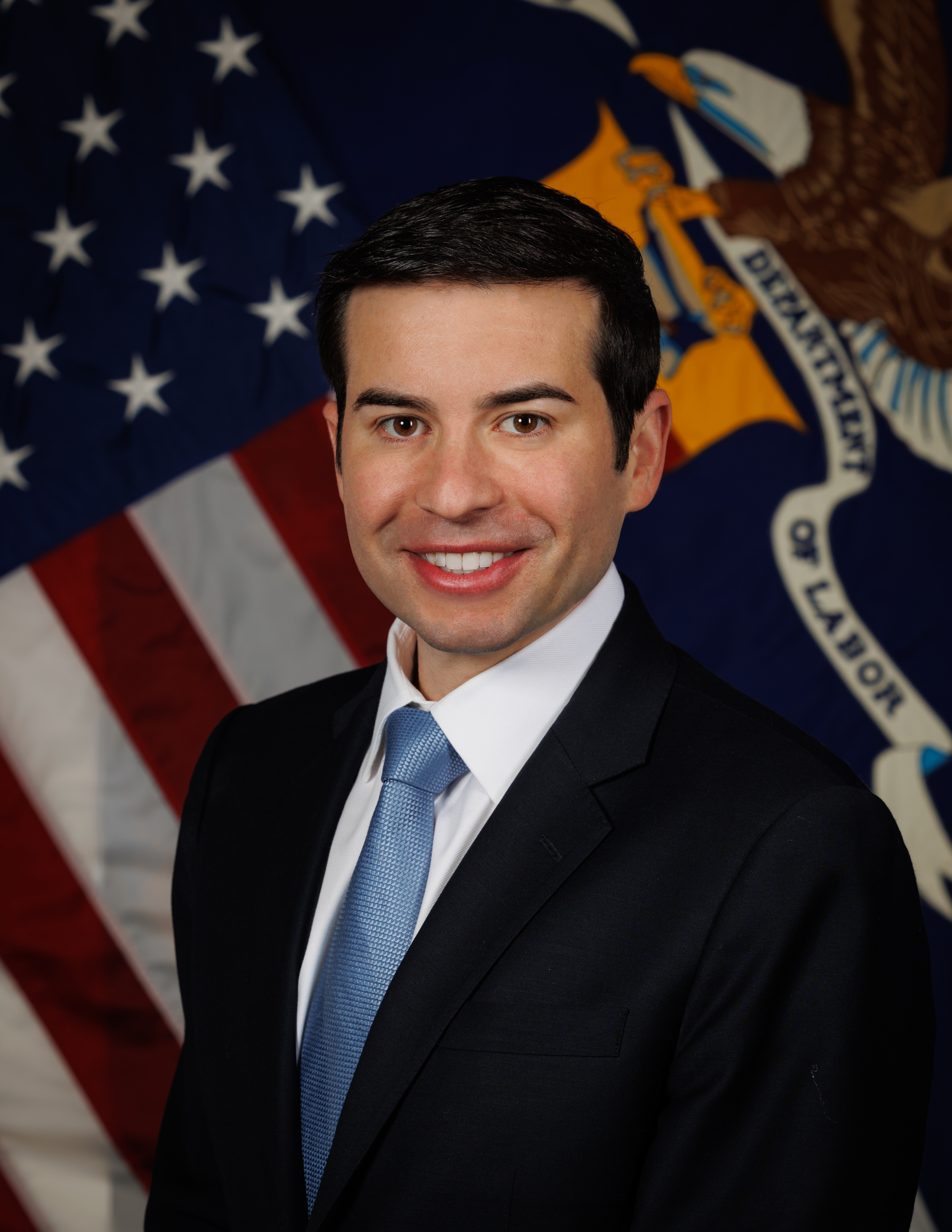
Keith Sonderling, 31st United States Secretary of Labor

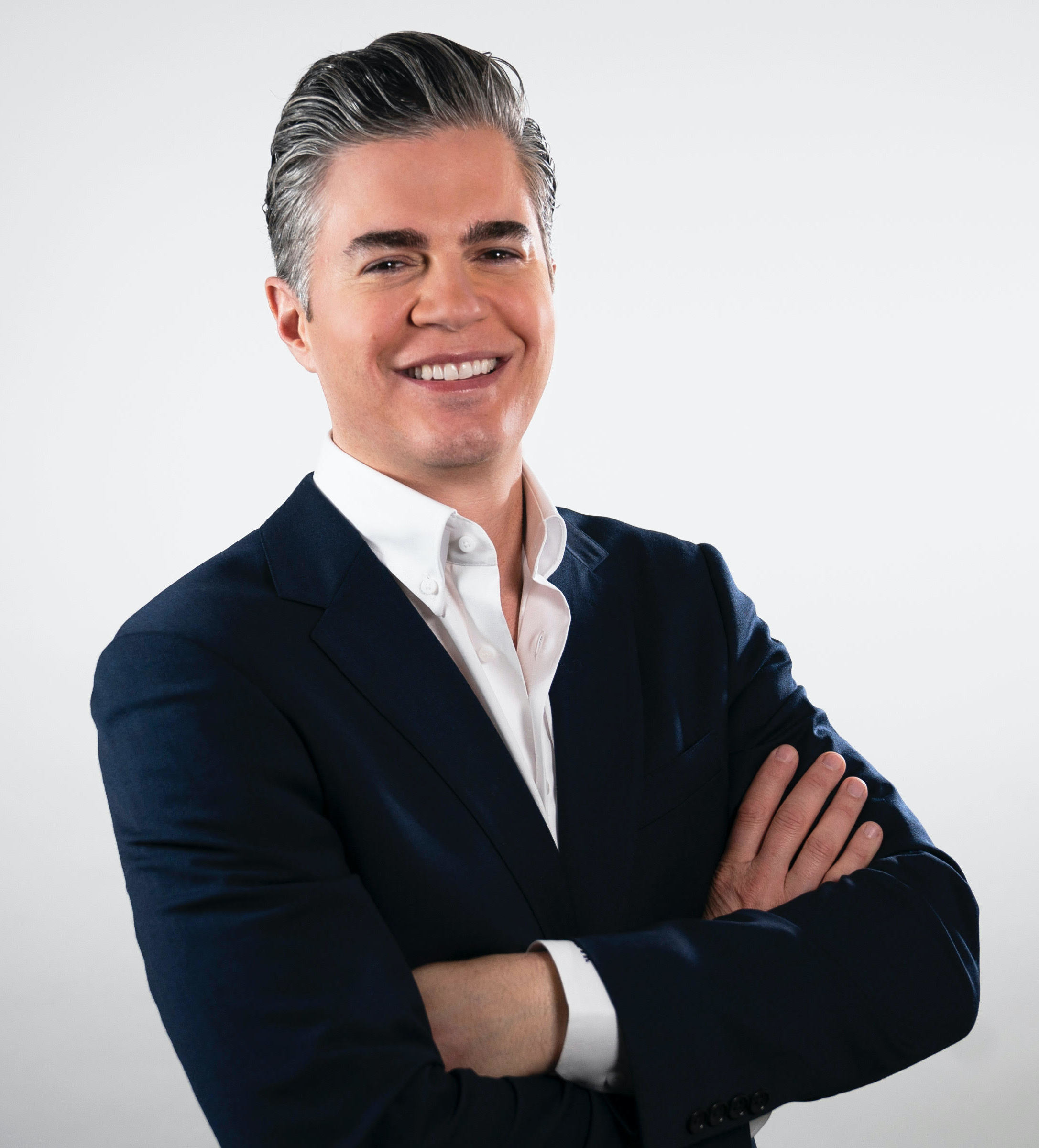
Will Kirby, dermatologist, winner Big Brother 2

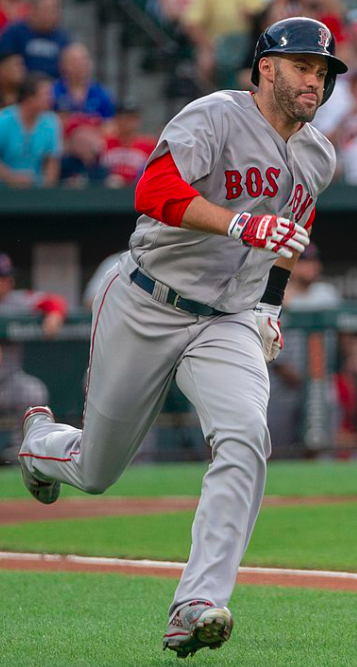
J.D. Martinez, baseball player

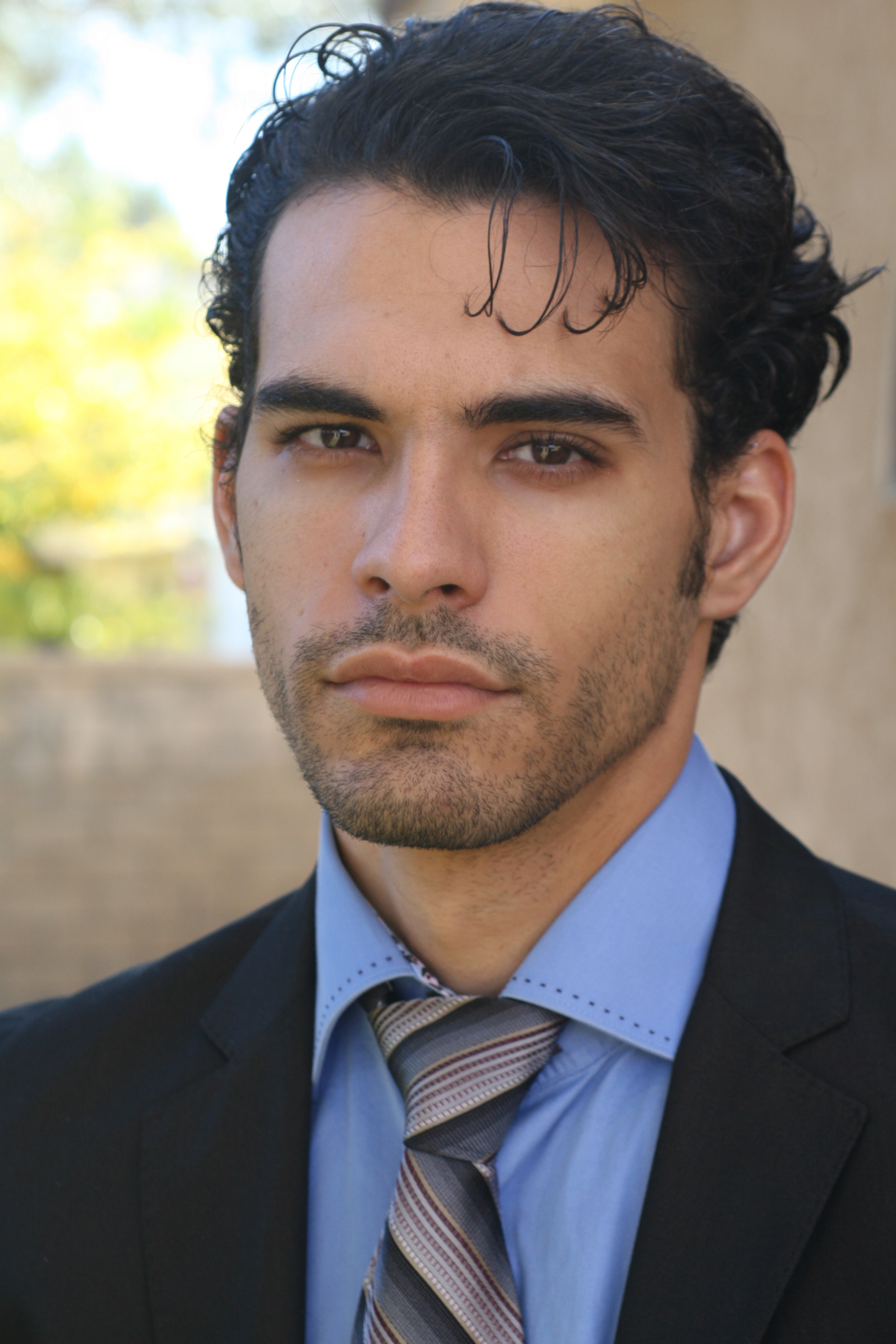
Geovanni Gopradi, actor

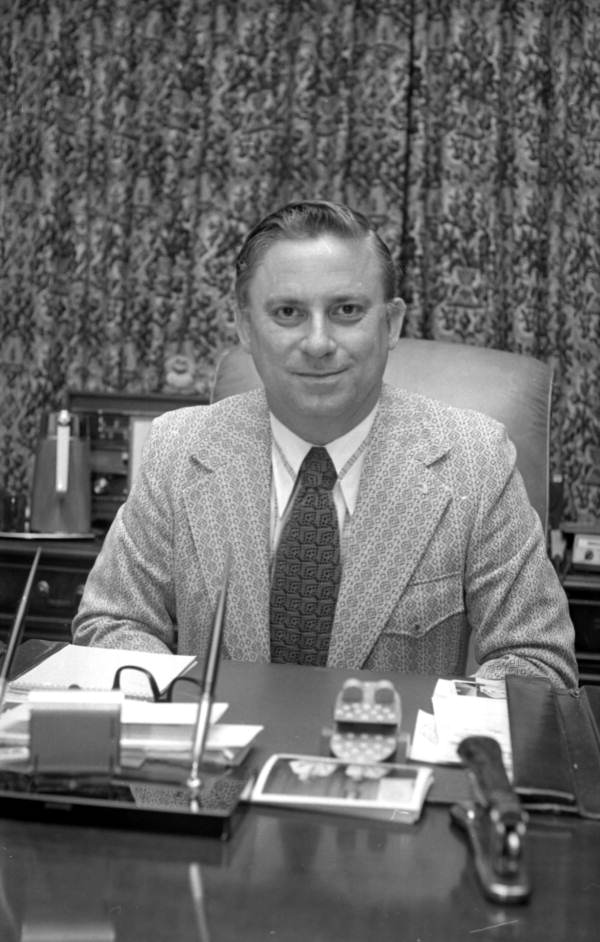
Louie L. Wainwright, former secretary of the Florida Division of Corrections, known for being the named respondent in two seminal U.S. Supreme Court cases

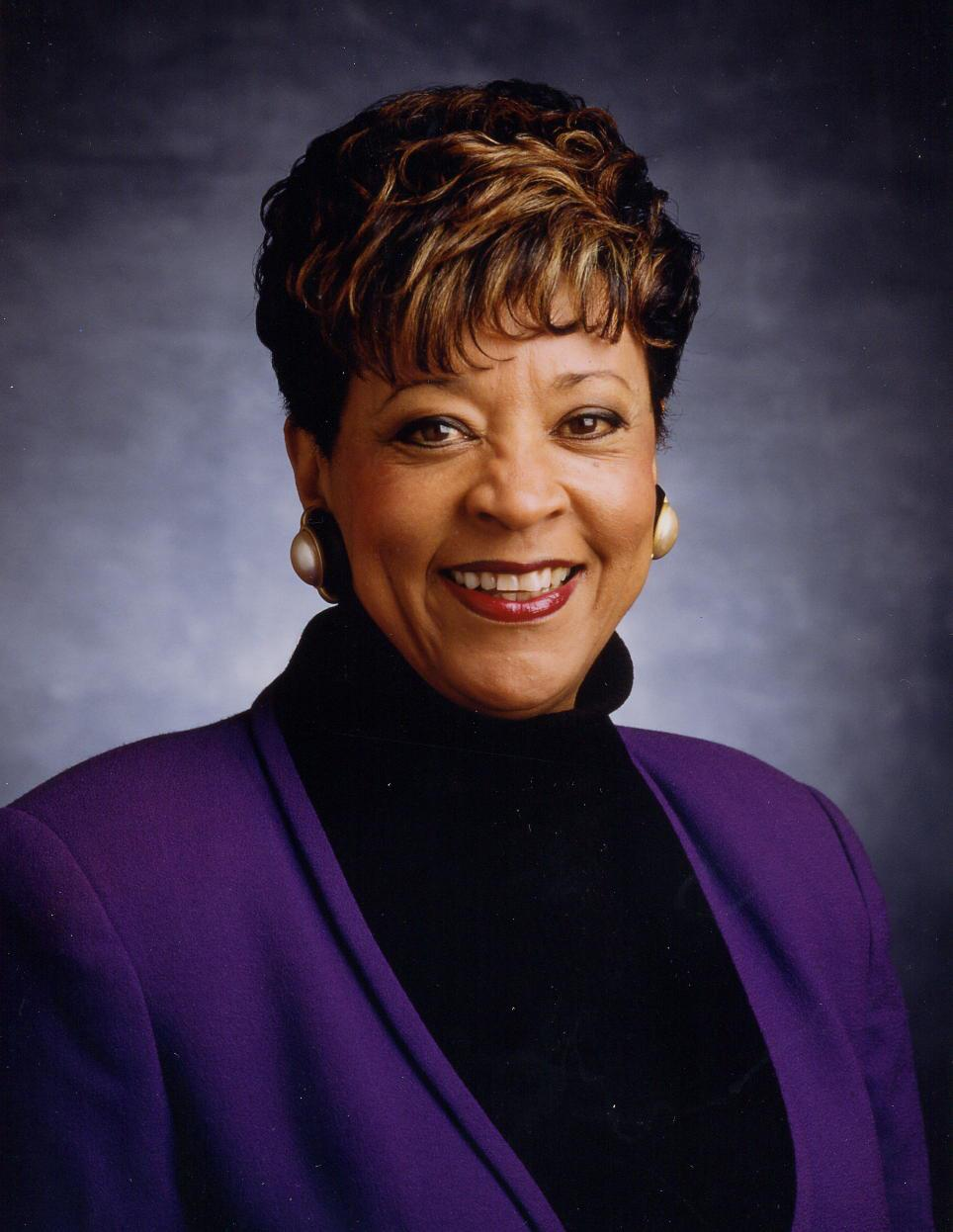
Carole Ward Allen, politician and professor

== Notable faculty and administrators ==
- Nathan Azrin – psychologist and behavioral modification researcher
- Tim Canova – attorney and law professor
- Ray F. Ferrero Jr. – attorney and former president of NSU
- Abraham S. Fischler – professor of education and former president of NSU
- Paul Hersey – behavioral scientist
- Jose V. Lopez – molecular biologist
- Jean Malecki – physician and public health official
- Scott Poland – psychologist and suicide prevention expert
- Marilyn Mailman Segal – psychologist and child development specialist
- David L. Shapiro – psychologist and forensic assessment expert
- Michael R. Simonson – instructional technologist and author
- Linda C. Sobell – psychologist and substance abuse specialist
- Mark B. Sobell – psychologist and addiction specialist
- Ariel David Soffer – notable cardiologist
- Theoharis C. Theoharides – physician and scientist
- Johannes Vieweg – medical school dean

== Research ==
NSU is classified among "R1: Doctoral Universities – Very High research activity" and as a "community engaged" university by the Carnegie Foundation for the Advancement of Teaching.

As of January 2025, more than 250 research projects are underway at NSU. These include examining novel anti-cancer therapeutics, coral reef restoration techniques, how bilingualism powers the brain, novel therapies for prostate cancer, gaps in children's vision care, local risk factors for breast cancer, genetic predispositions for cancer and early detection, and experimental treatments for veterans with PTSD.

One notable area of NSU's research looks at the impact of sharks on the health of the ocean.

=== Ocean research institutes housed at NSU ===
- National Coral Reef Institute
- Broward County Sea Turtle Conservation Program
- Guy Harvey Research Institute
- Institute for Natural and Ocean Sciences Research
- Save Our Seas Shark Research Center USA

=== Health care institutes housed at NSU ===
- NSU Health David and Cathy Husman Neuroscience Institute, which includes the Cathy J. Husman ALS Center
- AutoNation Institute for Breast Cancer Research and Care
- Institute for Neuro-Immune Medicine
- NSU Cell Therapy Institute
- Rumbaugh-Goodwin Institute for Cancer Research

=== Research statistics ===
- Research and development expenditures: $50,173,000 (FY23)
- Research and scholarship doctorates: 422 (FY22-23)
- Patent applications: 77
- Worldwide patents: 42
- High-potential technologies: 23

== NSU Health ==
NSU Health is a university-affiliated health care network that provide comprehensive, patient-centered care at the Fort Lauderdale-Davie campus and across Florida. NSU Health provides patient clinical care in the following areas: eye care; dental care; hearing, speech, and language services; medical care; pharmacy; psychology, counseling, and family therapy; and physical therapy and sports rehabilitation.

NSU Health leverages the university's cross-disciplinary research, translational approaches, and unique academic environment to offer integrated treatments to patients of all ages. With clinical trials conducted by physician-scientists and researchers, NSU Health connects patients with opportunities to participate in studies and receive novel therapies.

== Administration ==
Harry K. Moon, M.D., FACS, FRCSEd, is the seventh and current president and CEO of NSU.

== Gallery ==
The Alvin Sherman Library

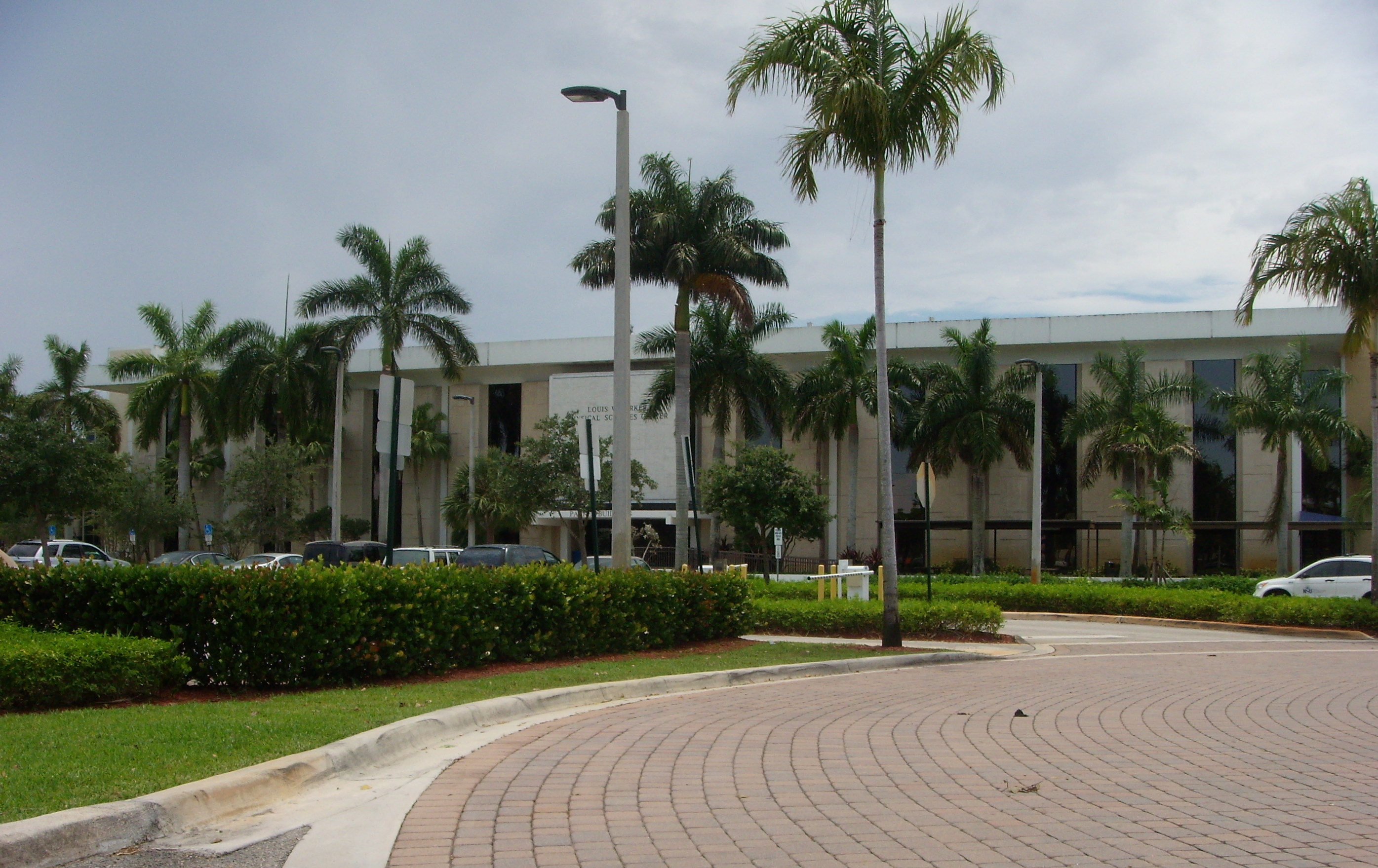
Parker Physical Sciences Building

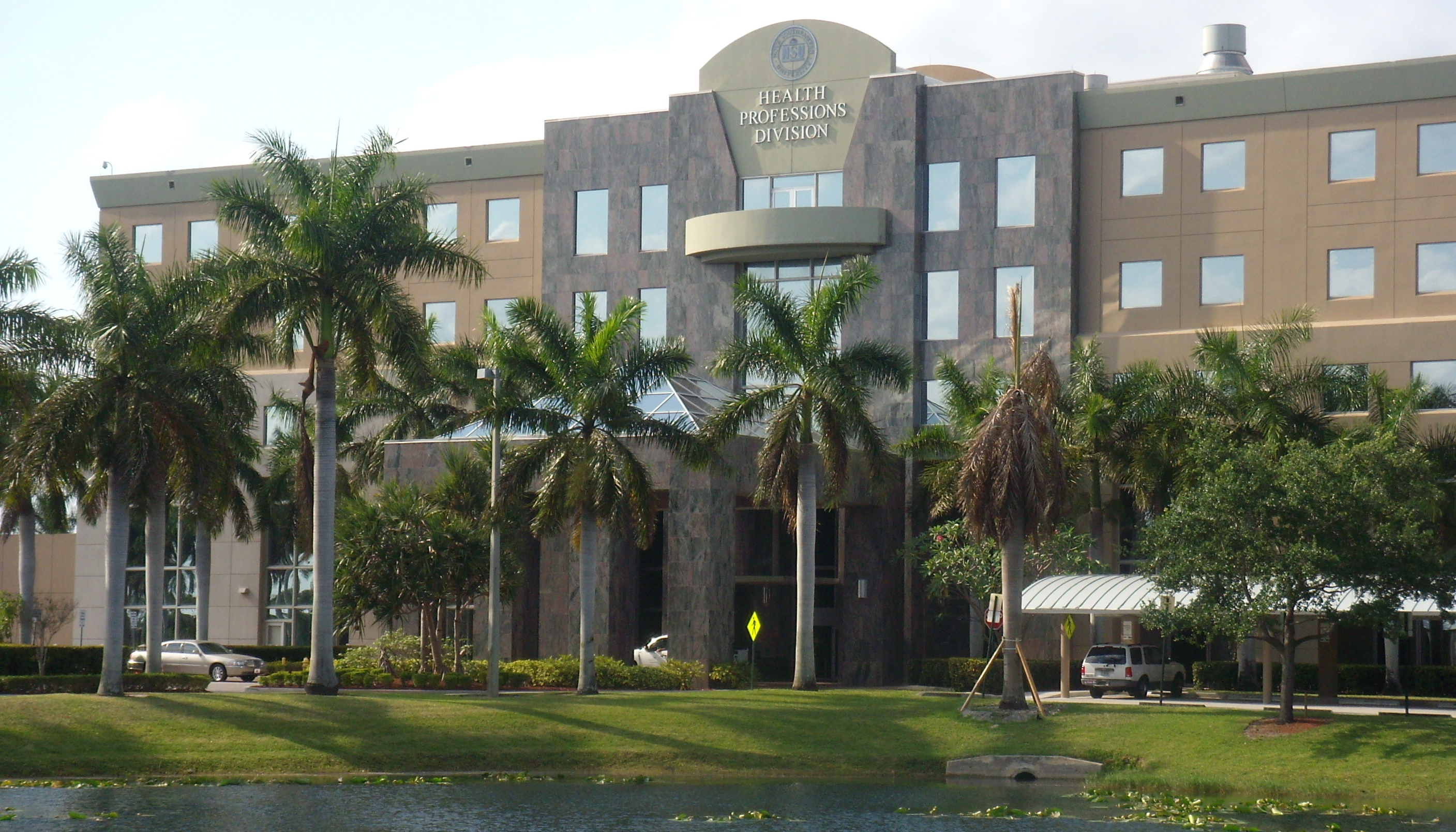
Terry Building – administration for all of the Health Professions Division

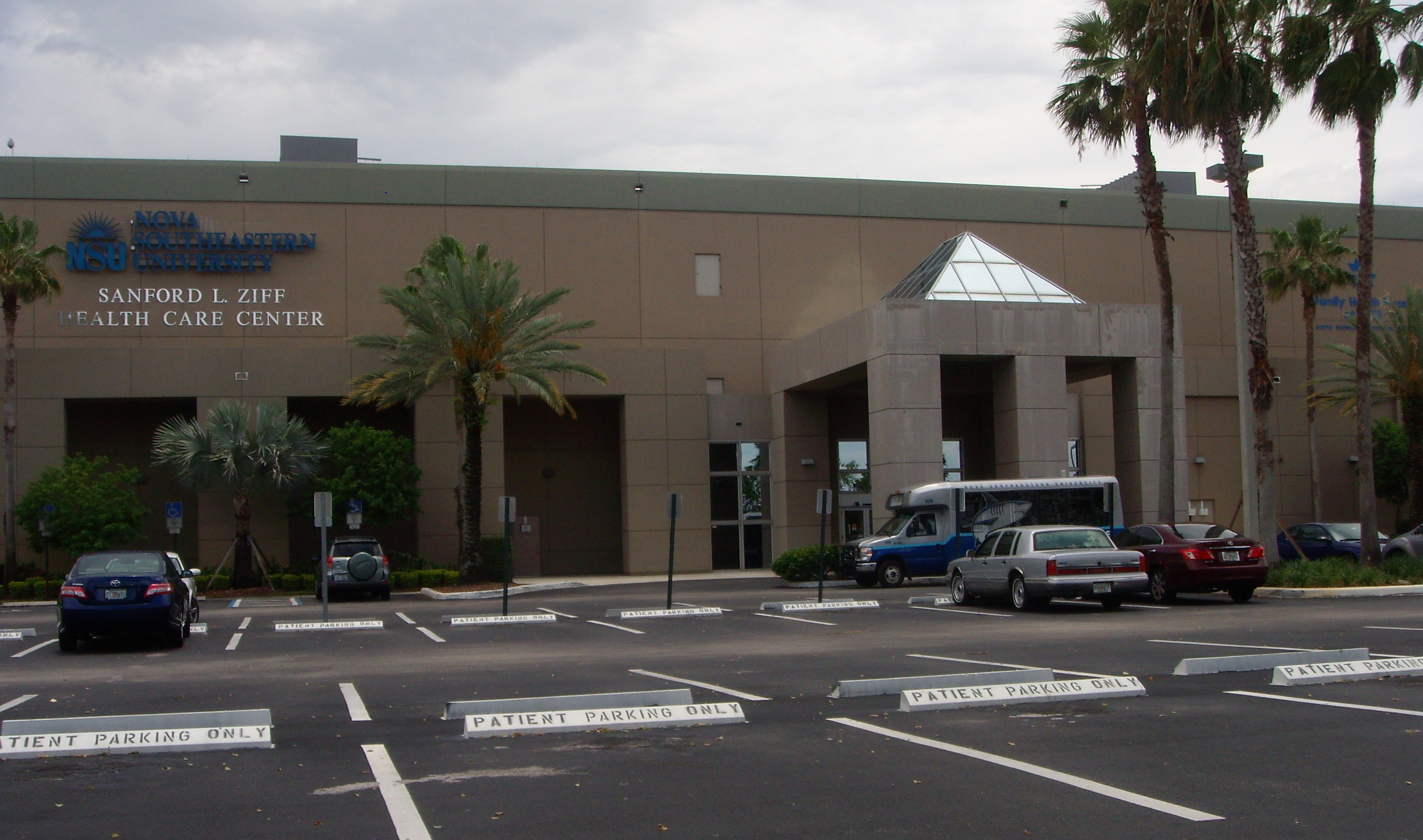
Sanford Ziff

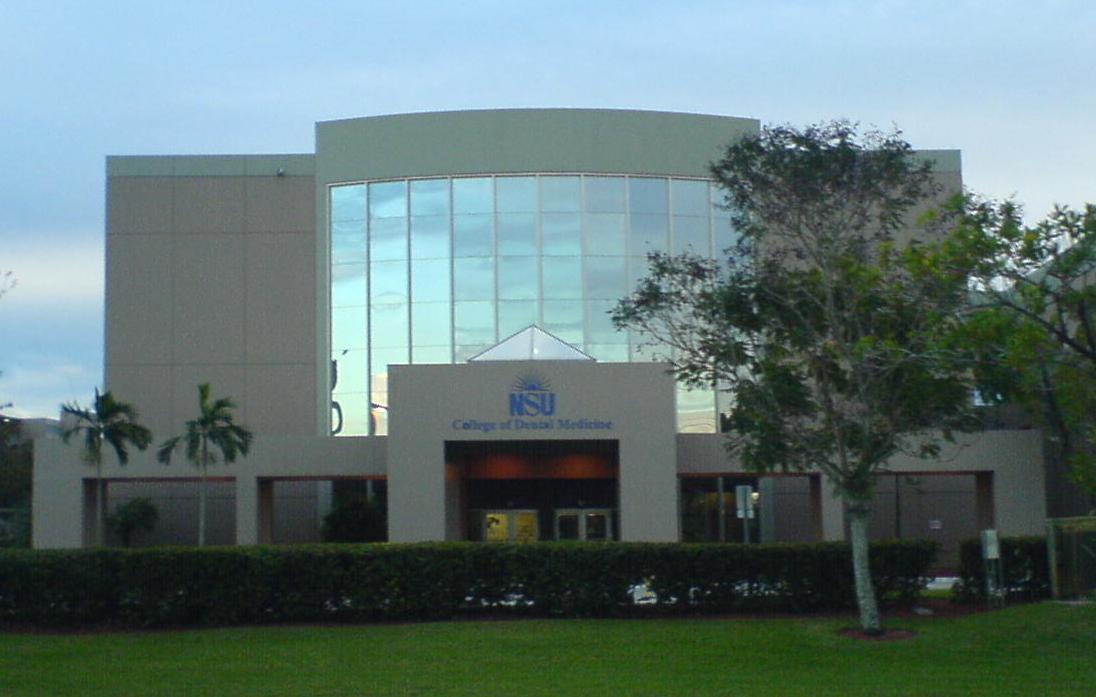
College of Dental Medicine building

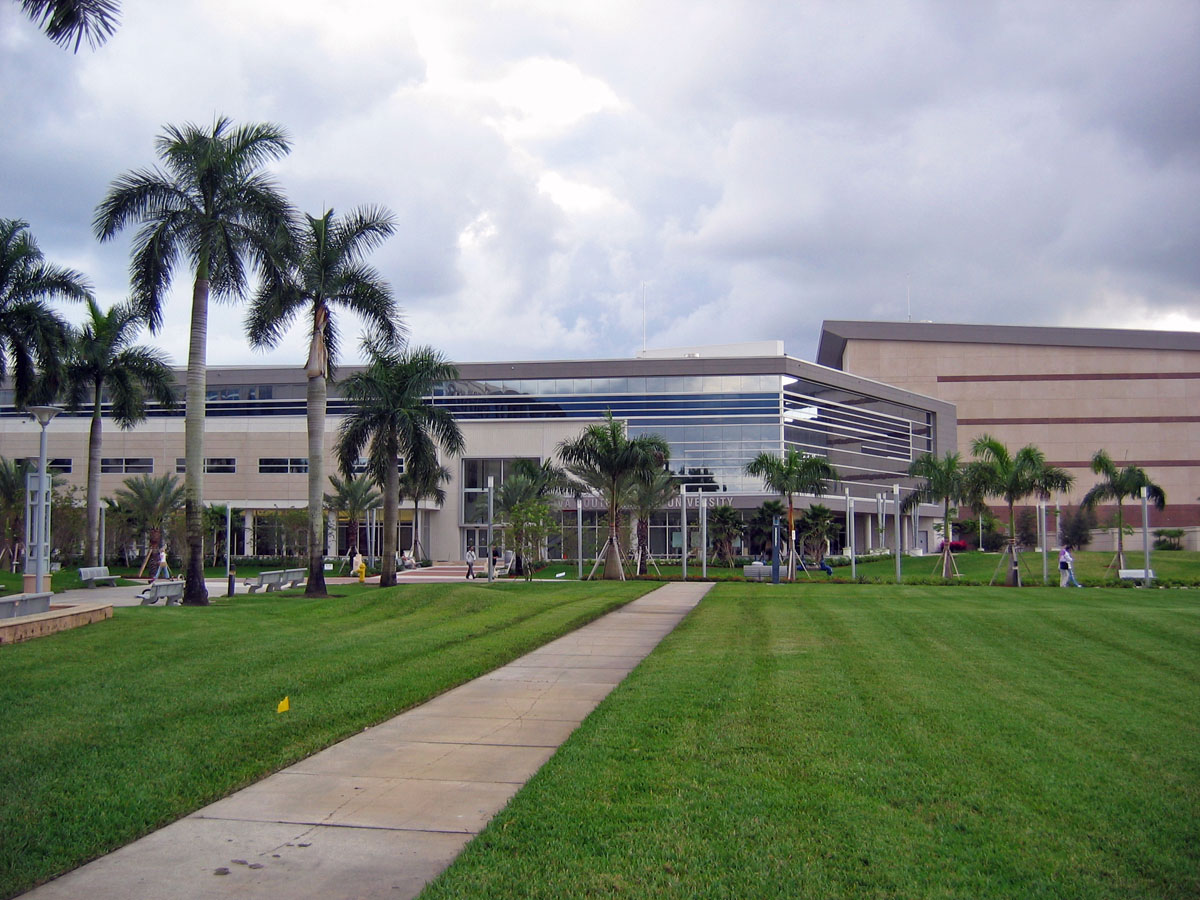
Performing and Visual Arts in the Don Taft University Center

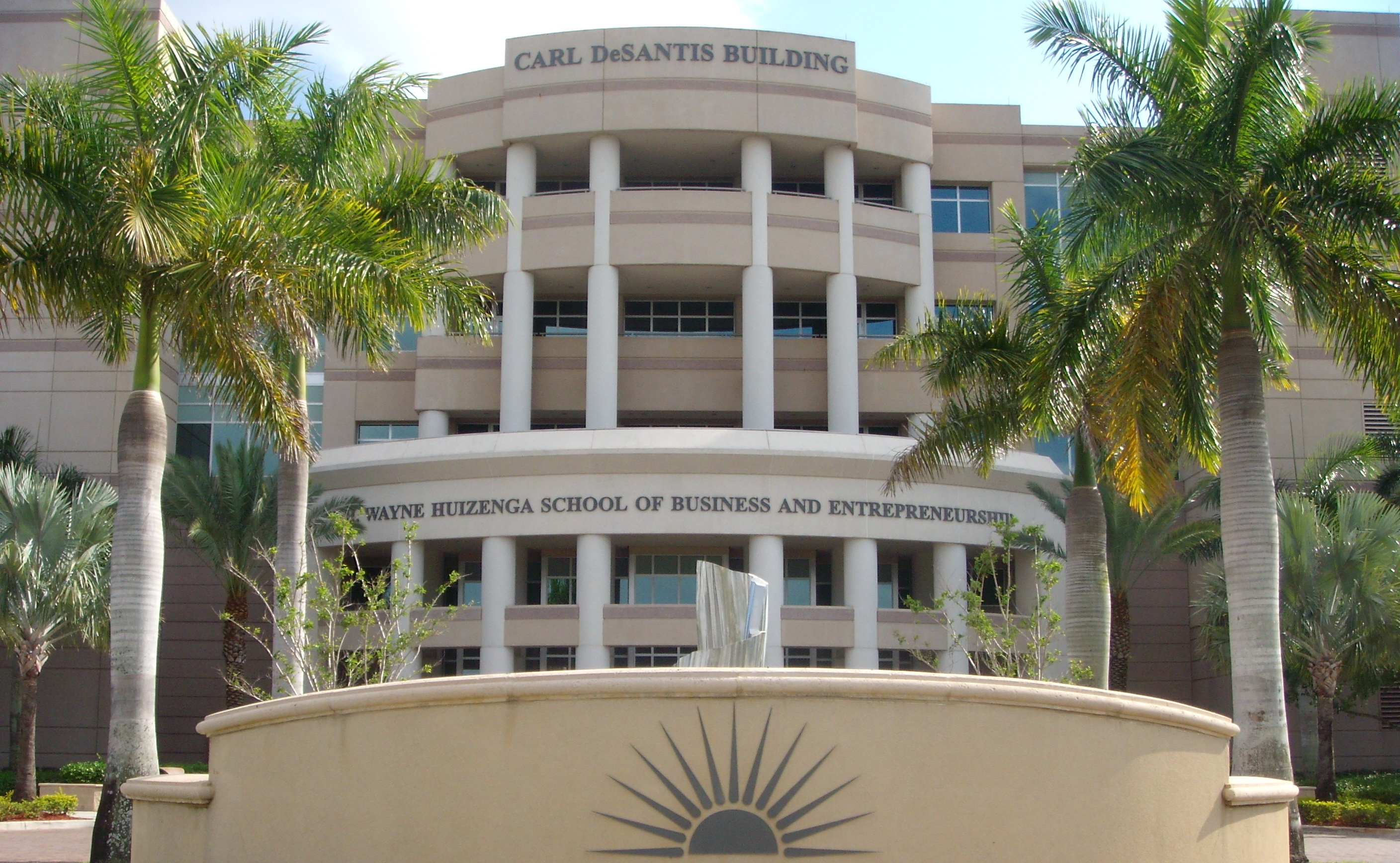
Carl DeSantis Building

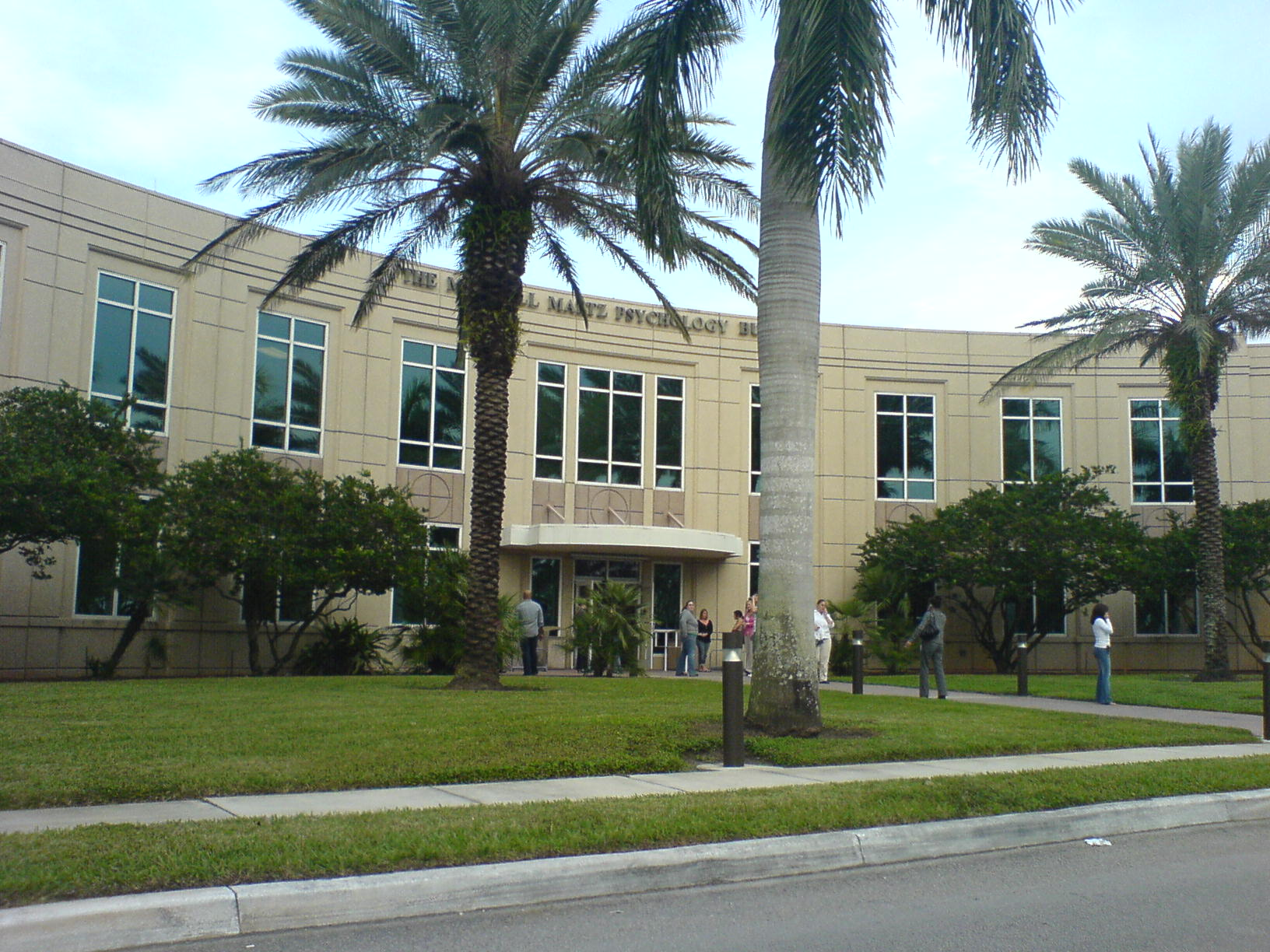
Maxwell Maltz Building

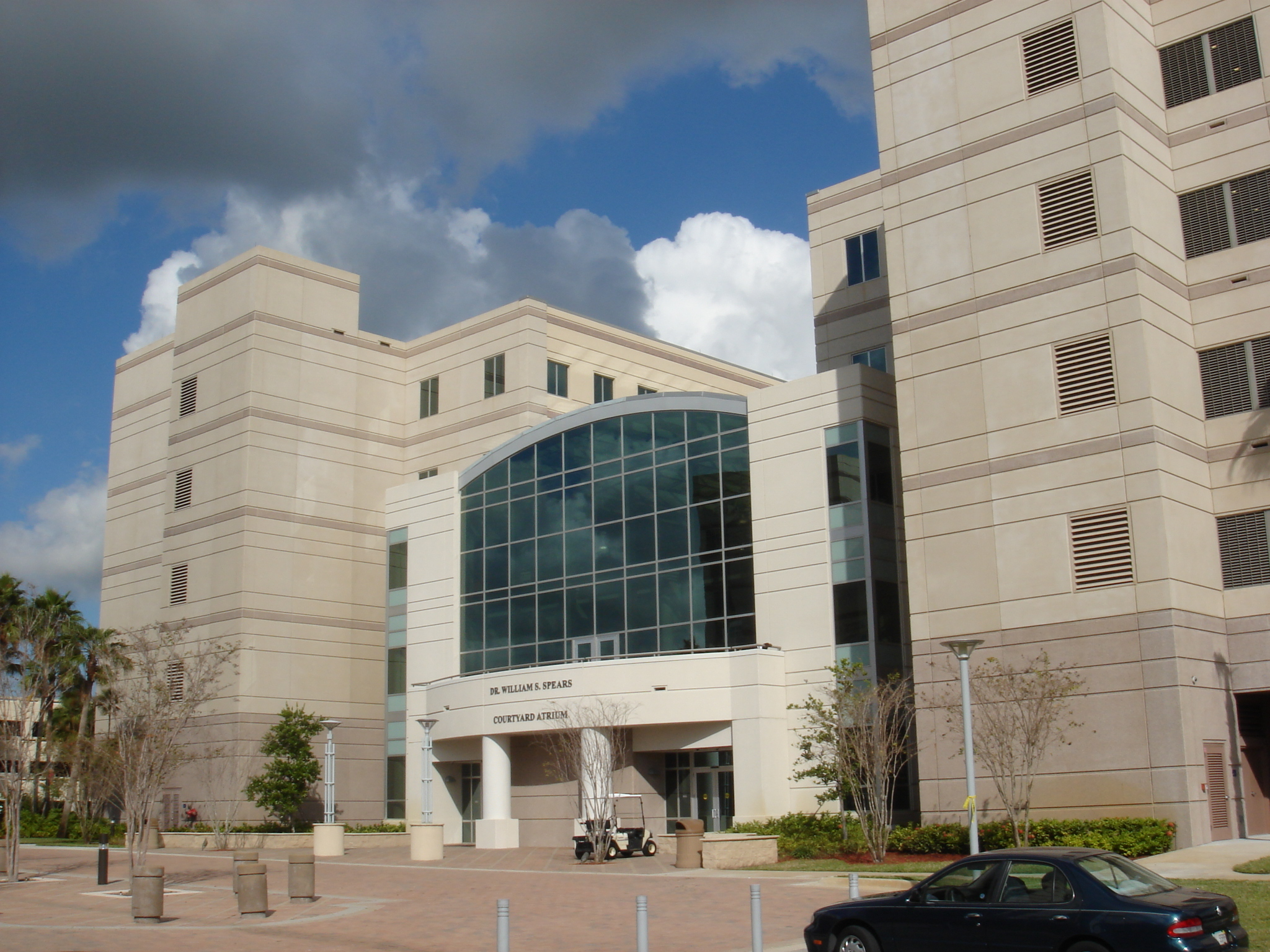
The Dr. William Spears Atrium

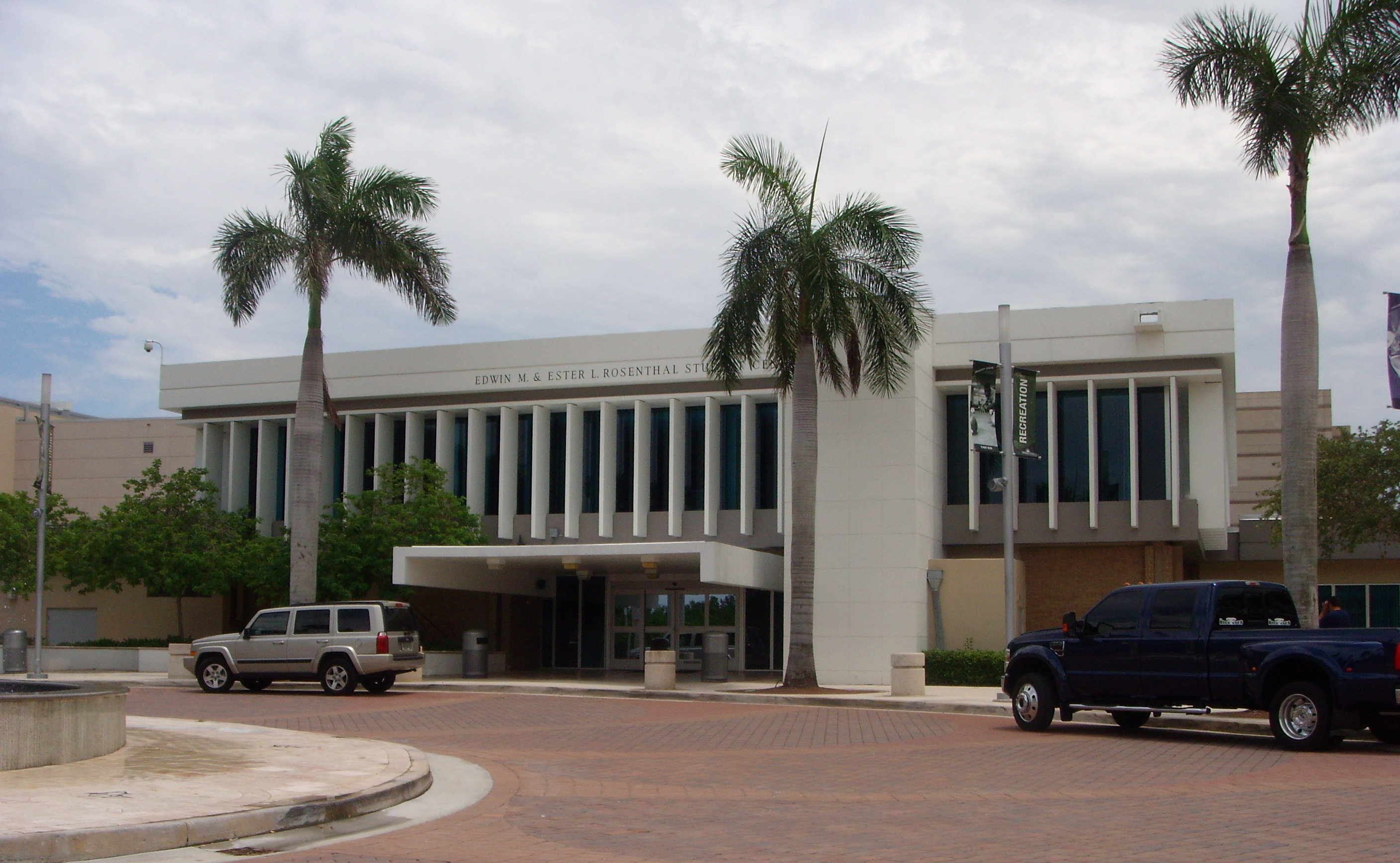
Rosenthal Student Center

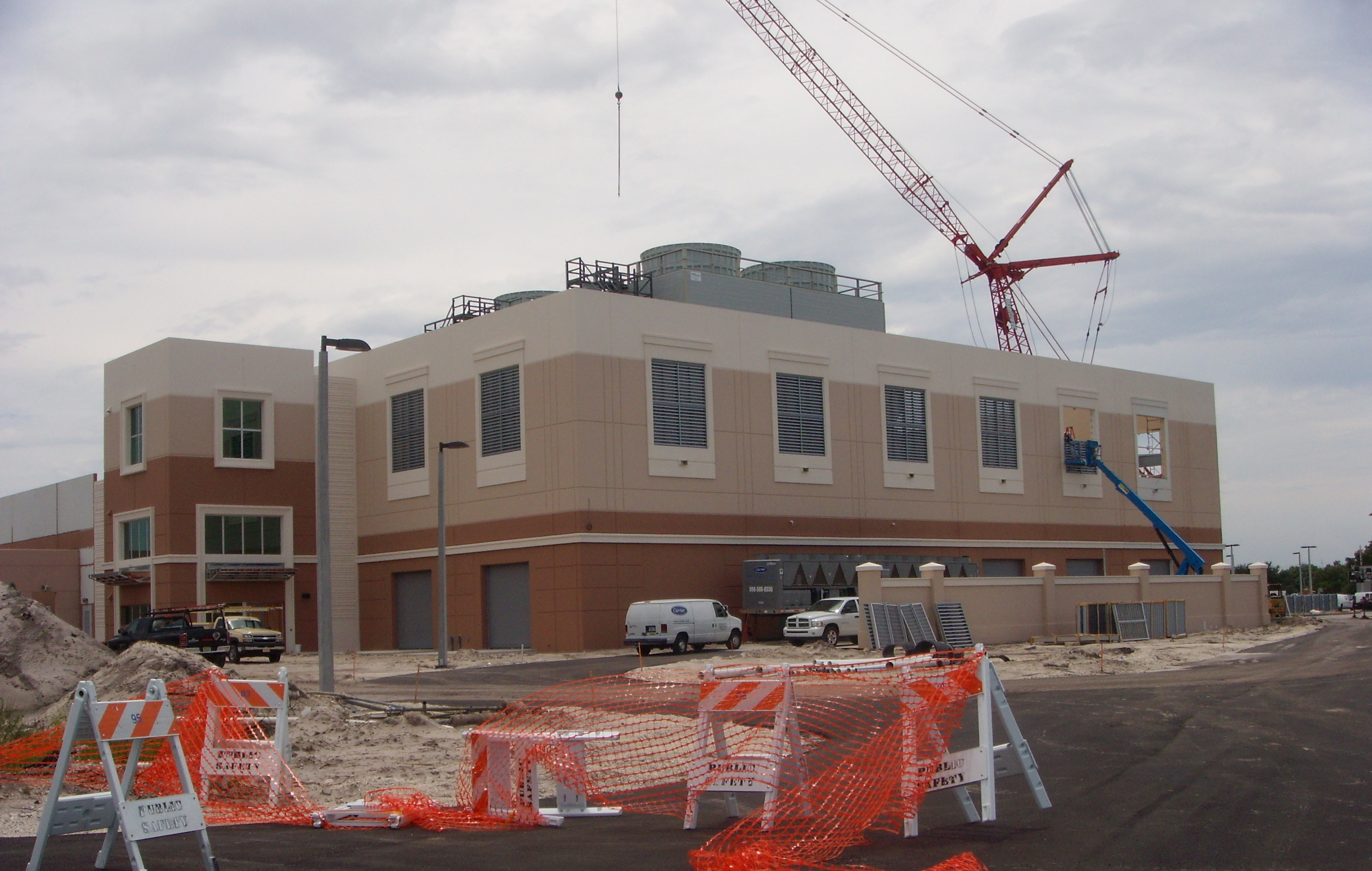
Physical plant facilities

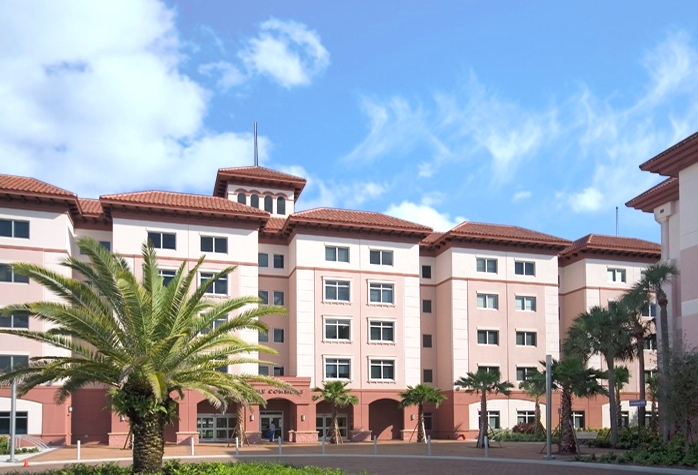
The Commons undergraduate housing

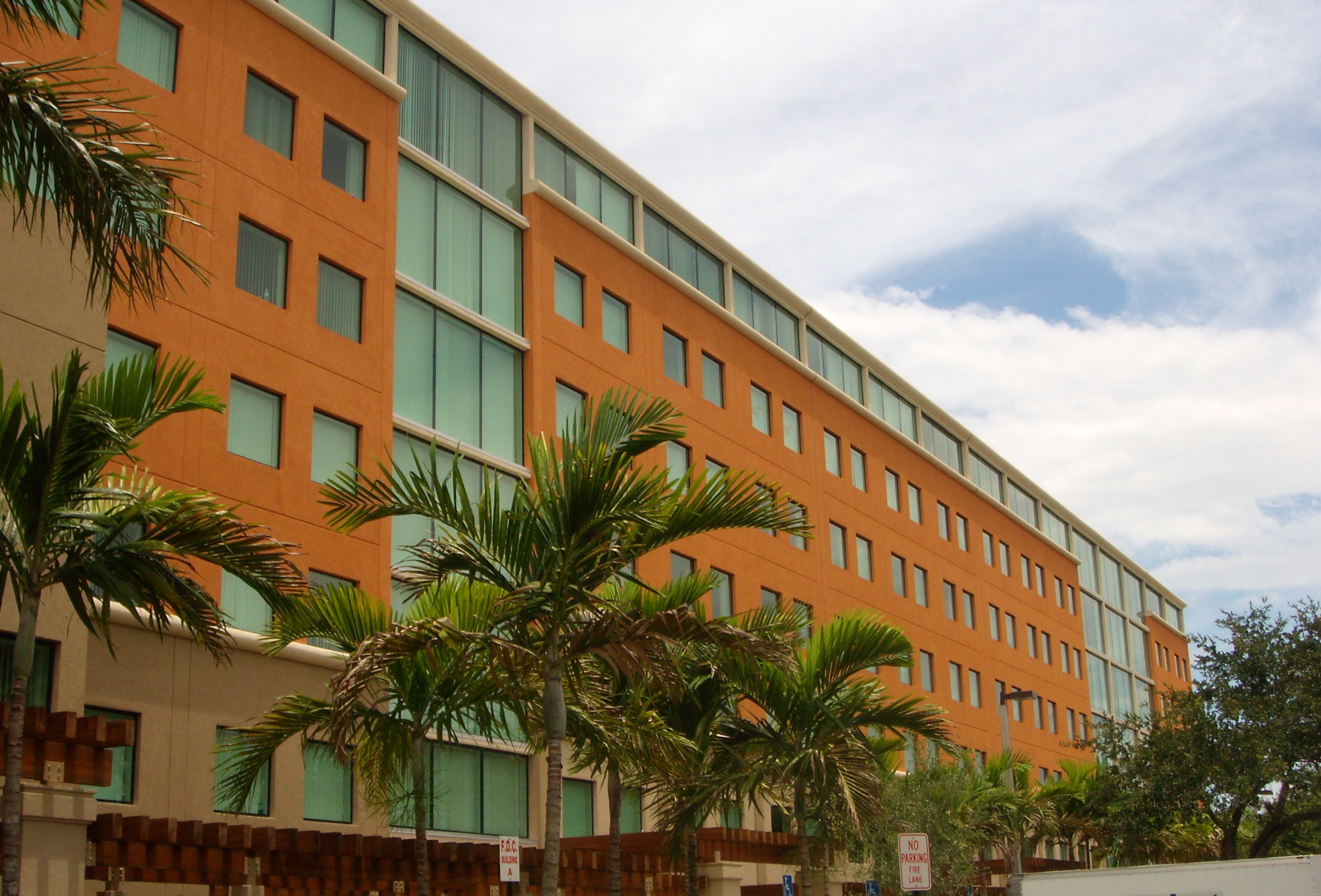
Rolling Hills – graduate housing

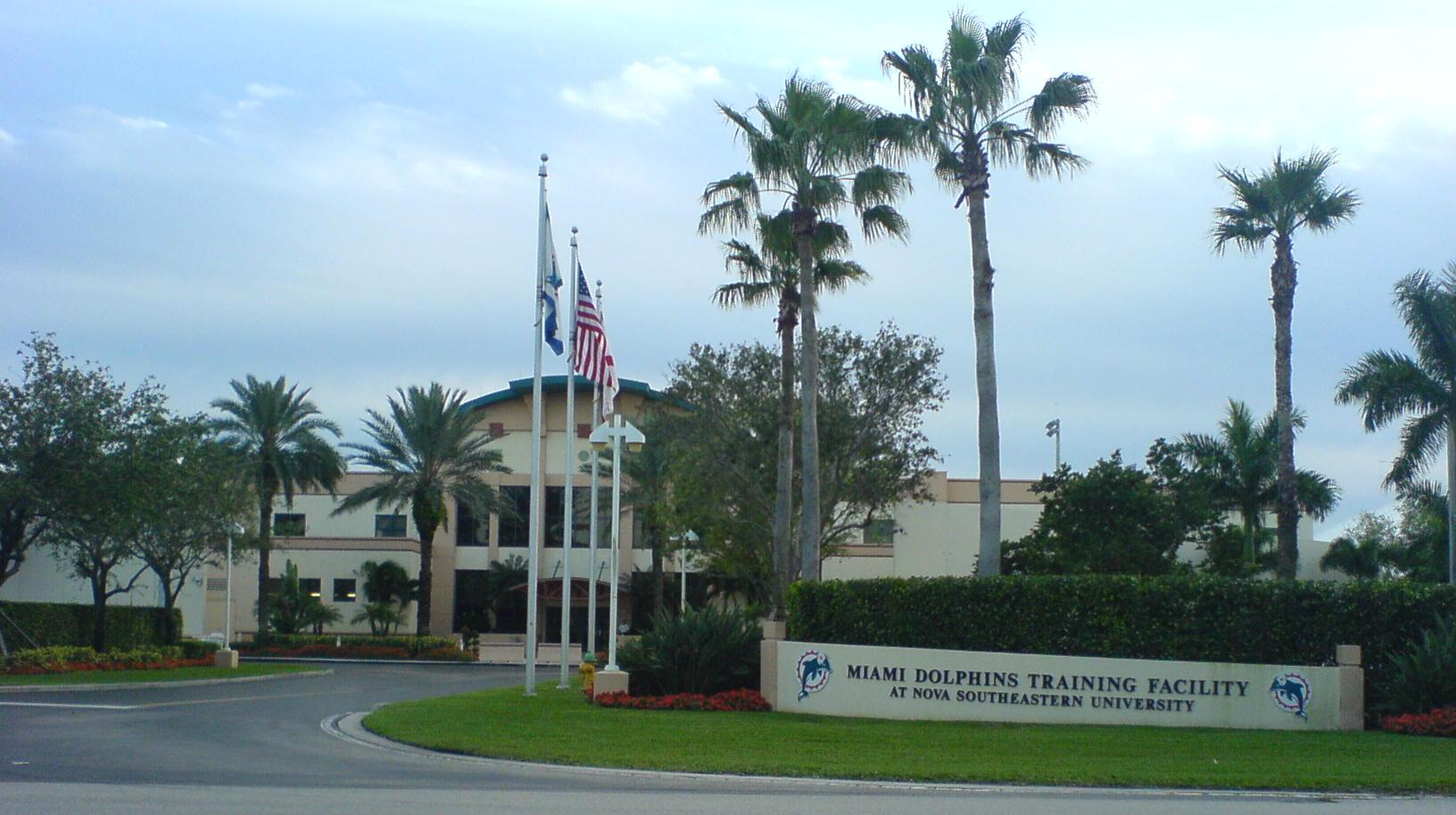
Former Miami Dolphins Training Facility on NSU's main campus

Rose and Alfred Miniaci Performing Arts Center

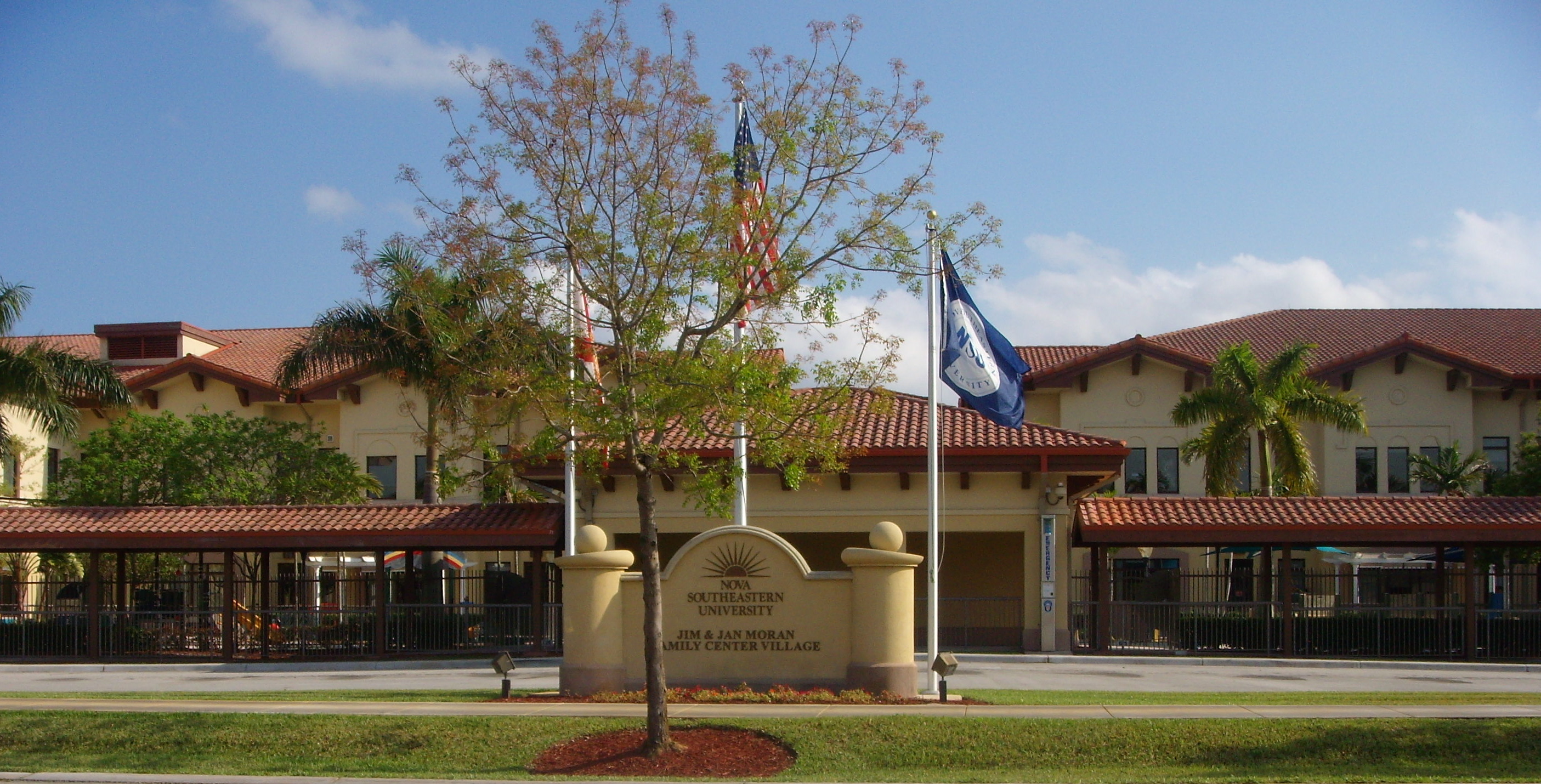
Jim & Jan Moran Family Center

== See also ==
- Independent Colleges and Universities of Florida
- Workers' unionization strike & controversy
