= Nova Southeastern University College of Psychology =

College at Nova Southeastern University

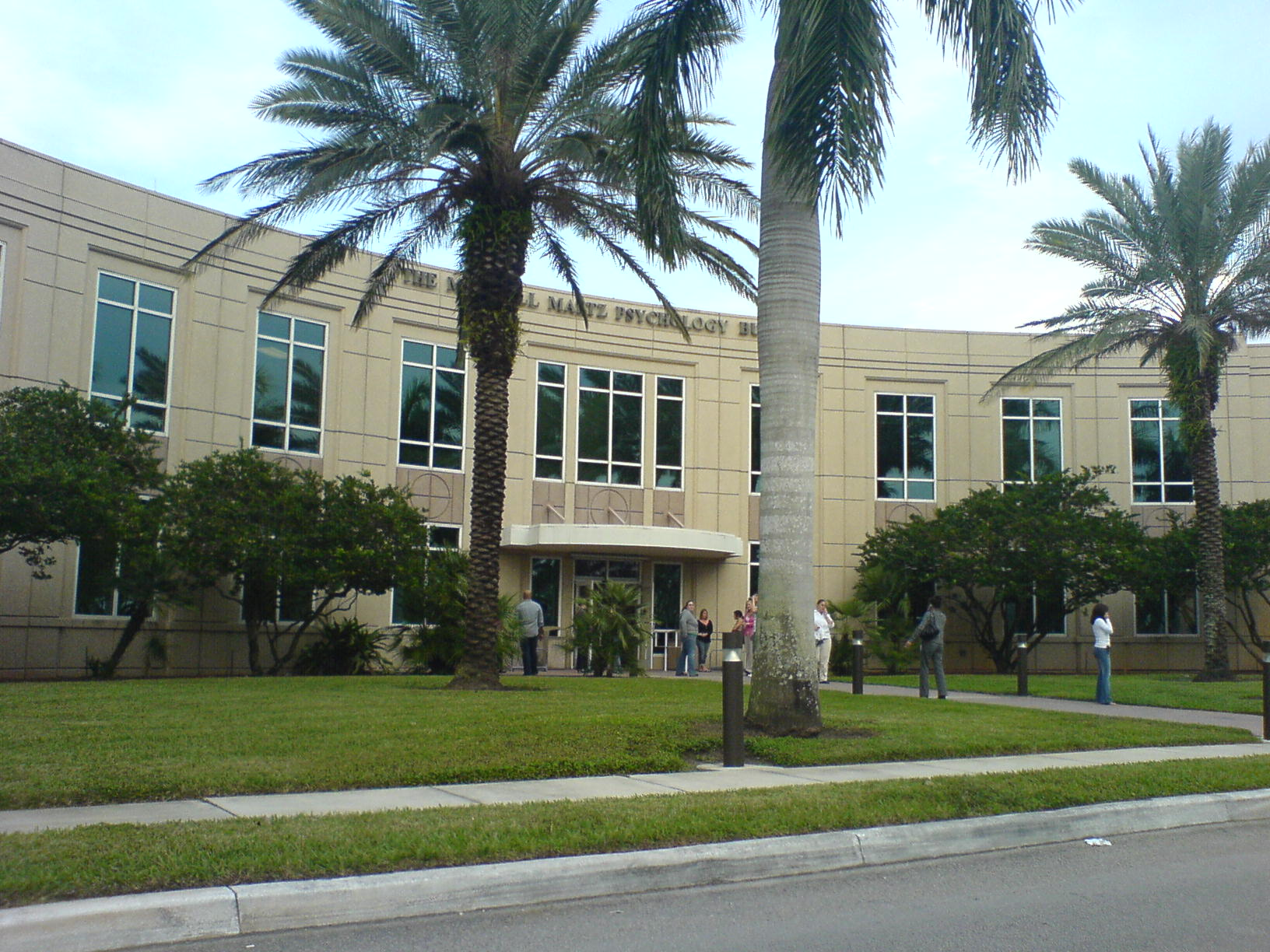
- Exterior of the Maxwell Maltz Building, home of NSU's College of Psychology
- Former name: Center for Psychological Studies
- Type: Private
- Established: 1967
- Dean: Karen Grosby
- Location: Davie, Florida, U.S.
- Campus: Suburban 314 acres (1.27 km^{2})
- Website: psychology.nova.edu

The College of Psychology at Nova Southeastern University was organized in 1967 and is located in the Maxwell Maltz Building on NSU's main campus in Davie, Florida. It serves to provide education to current and future psychologists and counseling professionals through training that provides individuals with an understanding of psychological research and the proper delivery of mental health care. Prior to a 2015 university-wide reorganization, the college was known as the Center for Psychological Studies. The reorganization brought in several undergraduate and graduate programs that were previously part of the Farquhar College of Arts and Sciences.

== Degree Programs ==
The college offers a number of bachelor's, master's, and doctoral degrees in the mental health field.

- B.S. in Behavioral Neuroscience
- B.S. in Psychology
- M.S. in Experimental Psychology
- M.S. in Forensic Psychology
- M.S. in General Psychology
- M.S. in Counseling
- Psy.S. in School Psychology
- Psy.D. in School Psychology
- Psy.D. in Clinical Psychology
- Ph.D. in Clinical Psychology

== Clinics ==
The college is home to several clinics which provide psychological services to the Ft. Lauderdale area. These clinics run from an ADHD assessment clinic to a family violence program and are open to the general public.

== Student organizations ==
There are a number of student organizations which have been established at the college. They include the Student Government Association, PRISM (formerly the Gay Straight Student Association), Counseling Student Organization, Ethnic Minority Association of Graduate Students (EMAGS), Eating Disorder Awareness Association (EDAA), and more. Membership in student organizations is open to all students of the college.
