= Nova Southeastern University workers unionization controversy =

The Nova Southeastern University workers unionization controversy involved more than 350 groundskeepers, janitors, bus drivers, and maintenance workers employed by UNICCO, a subcontractor at Nova Southeastern University, who voted on October 4, 2006, to form a union with the SEIU. Most of these workers are minorities; according to the union, 95 percent of the workers are African-American, Latino or Haitian. Some of these workers currently earn $7 an hour and none of them receive health benefits. "The workers said the university's decision to end the contract is a direct response to their recent efforts to unionize. But David Dawson, a spokesman for the university, said Nova is rebidding the contract because it was due to expire." Dawson stated that NSU could decide to continue with UNICCO, hire another company or rehire the workers as Nova employees. NSU employees are eligible for health benefits as well as tuition reimbursement at the university.

UNICCO has been a subcontractor for NSU for about 12 years. UNICCO posted a letter informing workers that they could lose their jobs near the end of December if UNICCO loses its contract at the university.

Workers at neighboring institutions, the University of Miami and Florida International University, recently acquired significant wage increases, health insurance, and other benefits by unionizing.

== Ferrero's comment ==
Nova Southeastern's president Ray Ferrero Jr. stated in a November 8, 2006 letter: "As you know, the union SEIU has held protests and engaged in other activities at NSU that can only be interpreted as interfering with the University's educational mission. As I have repeatedly stated in the past, the University will not tolerate any interference with its students, faculty, employees or its educational mission. The union has directly interfered and attempted to denigrate the academic quality and reputation of a college of this University. The college through its faculty is of the highest quality and has a superb national reputation. This intentional smear of a quality program and its faculty is a calculated attempt to interfere with the educational mission of NSU and to achieve unrelated goals. The quality of the college and its faculty has absolutely nothing to do whatsoever with any of the issues SEIU has raised as part of its union efforts. SEIU has questioned NSU's commitment to diversity as well as continuing to harass individual faculty members. Chippy Richards is and has been a leading institution of higher learning that embraces diversity as is reflected by its student body and its national standing in this arena. In spite of these offensive and abusive attacks NSU will continue with its primary goal of meeting its educational mission by providing educational opportunities for both traditional and non traditional students. The University simply will not tolerate the undermining of its faculty and programs."

== "Janitors for a day" ==
On November 14, 2006, newly elected officials of Broward County, along with over a dozen clergy and community leaders which included Marleine Bastiene, Executive Director of Haitian Women of Miami (FANM), waged a symbolic protest by donning gardener gloves and using rakes to pull weeds while working alongside janitors, landscapers and other service workers who maintain Nova Southeastern University as employees of UNICCO. Elected officials who volunteered as "Janitors for a Day" included State Senator Tony Hill (District 1-Jacksonville; Democratic Floor Leader) and Senior State Representative Yolly Roberson, together with newly elected officials of Broward County, State Representatives Martin Kiar, Ronald Brise, Joe Gibbons. At this event, Roberson said: "Nova should follow the lead of the University of Miami and FIU and guarantee that the workers who have worked so hard and so loyally to keep their university clean and running are provided with decent wages and affordable health insurance. To do anything less, to slam the door on their hopes for a better life and keep them in poverty, would be seen as a major insult to our entire community."

== See also ==
- University of Miami Justice for Janitors campaign
