= Theoharis C. Theoharides =

Greek-American physician-scientist and immunologist

Theoharis C. Theoharides (born February 11, 1950) is a Greek-American physician-scientist whose research focuses on mast cell biology, neuroimmune interactions, and neuroinflammation. He is a professor at Nova Southeastern University, where he serves as Vice Chair of Clinical Immunology and Executive Director of the Institute for Neuro-Immune Medicine. He previously served as Professor and Director of the Laboratory of Molecular Immunopharmacology & Drug Discovery at Tufts University School of Medicine.

== Early life and education ==
Theoharides was born in Thessaloniki, Greece. He attended Anatolia College before studying at Yale University, where he obtained a B.A. in Biology and History of Medicine, then M.S., M.Phil., Ph.D. in Pharmacology, and finally an M.D. in 1983. He completed training in internal medicine at the New England Medical Center.

== Academic and professional career ==
At Nova Southeastern University, Theoharides is Vice Chair of Clinical Immunology and Executive Director of the Institute for Neuro-Immune Medicine. He also holds an adjunct professorship in immunology at Tufts University School of Medicine, where he previously served as Professor and Director of the Laboratory of Molecular Immunopharmacology & Drug Discovery.

He served as Clinical Pharmacologist for the Massachusetts Drug Formulary Commission from 1983 to 2022.

== Research ==
Theoharides' research explores how mast cells selectively release mediators and interact with microglia, influence blood–brain barrier permeability, and contribute to neuroinflammation in conditions such as autism spectrum disorder, multiple sclerosis, chronic fatigue syndrome, and Long COVID.

He has published reviews such as Recent advances in our understanding of mast cell activation (2019) discussing mast cell roles in inflammation.

In Mast cells in the autonomic nervous system and potential role in disorders with dysautonomia and neuroinflammation (2024), he examined mast cell interfaces with autonomic dysfunction.

He also reviewed the relationship between psychological stress and mast cell activation (2020).

In the autism field, a collaborative study reported reduced cytokine levels among children with autism spectrum disorders who received a luteolin-containing formulation.

In peripheral inflammation studies, Genitourinary mast cells and survival addressed mast cell roles in bladder pain and interstitial cystitis.

He is principal investigator of a project on myalgic encephalomyelitis/chronic fatigue syndrome (ME/CFS) examining how extracellular vesicles from patients may influence mast cell and microglial activation.

During the COVID-19 pandemic, he coauthored Successful Treatment of a Patient With Severe COVID-19 discussing mast cell–modulating therapeutic considerations.

== Patents and product development ==
According to his curriculum vitae, Theoharides holds over 30 patents in immunology and mast cell biology. He is associated with Algonot LLC, which markets flavonoid-based formulations containing luteolin and related compounds.

== Selected publications ==
- Theoharides TC, Valent P, Akin C. Mast cells, mastocytosis, and related disorders. New England Journal of Medicine. 2015.
- Patel AB, Tsilioni I, Leeman SE, Theoharides TC. Neurotensin stimulates sortilin and mTOR in human microglia. Proceedings of the National Academy of Sciences. 2016.
- Middleton E Jr, Kandaswami C, Theoharides TC. Effects of plant flavonoids on mammalian cells. Pharmacological Reviews. 2000.
- Theoharides TC, Kempuraj D. Role of SARS-CoV-2 Spike-Protein-Induced Activation of Microglia and Mast Cells in the Pathogenesis of Neuro-COVID. Cells. 2023.
- Tsilioni I, Taliou A, Francis K, Theoharides TC. Children with autism spectrum disorders... Translational Psychiatry. 2015.

== Recognition and impact ==
His university biography states he has authored over 500 peer-reviewed publications. His work is cited in numerous reviews on mast cell activation and neuroimmunology, and his ongoing projects in ME/CFS and dysautonomia reflect continuing research activity.

== See also ==
- Mast cell activation syndrome
- Neuroinflammation
- Psychoneuroimmunology
- Immunopharmacology
