= Scott Poland =

American psychologist

- Occupations: Professor of Psychology Co-Director of the Suicide and Violence Prevention Office

Academic background
- Education: Ed.D. Psychology; M.A. Counseling; B.S. Psychology; Ball State University; Arizona State University

Academic work
- Discipline: School Psychology
- Sub-discipline: Suicide Risk Prevention
- Institutions: Nova Southeastern University

Scott Poland is an American licensed psychologist known for his work on suicide risk prevention and school safety. At Nova Southeastern University in Florida, he is a Professor in the College of Psychology, as well as the Co-Director of the Suicide and Violence Prevention Office.

== Education ==
Poland begin his education at Arizona State University where he received a Bachelor's degree in Psychology. Following graduation, he pursued a Master's in Counseling from Ball State University. He later continued his education at Ball State University, and earned a Doctorate in School Psychology. James Treloar was his advisor there. His thesis entitled The effects of cognitive behavior modification on the math achievement of reflective and impulsive second grade students explored the effectiveness of different tutoring procedures and the effect that students' cognitive styles would have on the success.

== Career ==
Following the death of his father, Poland was motivated to pursue work in counseling and psychology. His first full-time job in his career was short lived as a counselor at a private boys school. He also spent time working in two hospitals. After earning his Doctorate degree he worked as a school psychologist in Texas. He then began acting as Director of the Department of Psychological Services within his district of Texas. At this time he served as the President of the National Association of School Psychologists from 2000-2001.

Poland started at Nova Southeastern University in 2005 under the title of School Psychology Program Administrator/Core Faculty. As of 2024, Poland is still employed at Nova Southeastern University in Florida as full-time faculty in the Department of Clinical and School Psychology. In 2006 he also took on the title of Co-Director for the Suicide and Violence Prevention Office.

In addition to being a professor, he also works as a speaker through Safe & Sound Schools. There he conducts presentations for school staff and parents regarding youth suicide, school violence, and school safety. Some of the programs he offers are Student Responsibility and Decision-Making Presentation for Adolescents; Bullying and Suicide: Keys to Prevention and Resiliency; School Crisis and Liability; and Parenting in a Challenging World.

== Research ==
Poland's research primarily consists of suicide risk prevention and school safety. The focus population is at risk youth and adults who are in the position to help mitigate risk. The topics he is considered to be an expert on are school safety, youth suicide, self-injury, bullying, school crisis prevention/intervention, threat assessment, and parenting in challenging times. This research has provided assistance with risk prevention in various schools and districts across the country.

In much of Poland's research, he looks at the intersection of suicide risk prevention and school safety. Through his research, he has found that both topics have similar risk factors. Some of those factors are at-risk youth, bullying, relevant legal issues, and the current state of crisis response in school settings. By focusing on suicide within the context of school, he created a different framework to addressing rising trends and school-student safety as a whole. A large portion of youth's time is accounted for when they are placed in the context of school. In the context of school, vulnerable times of the year, youth-adult relationships, mental health, and more are considered. His research emphasizes the importance of school staff, parents, and youth have in risk prevention.

Poland's research has provided him the opportunity to be a speaker, educating school staff, parents, and youth. His research provides schools with action items to assist with risk prevention and safety. Poland has traveled to various states throughout the country, consulting and training on risk prevention in schools. Some of his biggest publications were the Suicide Safer Schools Plan for the state of Texas and the Crisis Action Toolkit-Suicide for the state of Montana.

== Books ==
- Poland, Scott (1989). Suicide intervention in the schools. The Guilford school practitioner series. New York: Guilford Press.
- Erbacher, Terri A.; Singer, Jonathan B.; Poland, Scott (2015). Suicide in schools: a practitioner's guide to multi-level prevention, assessment, intervention, and postvention. School-based practice in action series. New York: Routledge, Taylor & Francis Group.
- Poland, Scott; Ferguson, Sara (2021). Lessons learned from school shootings: perspectives from the United States of America. SpringerBriefs in psychology. Cham, Switzerland: Springer.
- Poland, Ferguson, Scott, Sara (January 8, 2025). School Crisis Intervention: An Essential Guide for Practitioners. Guildford Practical.

This is not an exhaustive list of books by Scott Poland. Additionally, he has authored various chapters and articles.
