= Nova Southeastern University College of Optometry =

College of Optometry in Florida

The College of Optometry is part of the Health Professions Division of Nova Southeastern University in Davie, Florida. The four year Doctor of Optometry program at NSU includes two years of basic sciences, optics, anatomy, pathology, physiology and pharmacology followed by clinical training in pediatrics, primary care, ocular disease, contact lenses, and rehabilitative (low vision) optometry. This is the only Doctor of Optometry program in Florida. Programs at NSU-College of Optometry include a mini-MBA elective for optometry students, a five year extended curriculum option and a one year preparatory program. Post-graduation opportunities exist in a Master's in Clinical Vision Research (MSCVR), and multiple clinical residencies.

It awards a Master of Science in clinical vision research and a Doctor of Optometry.

In 2018, the university and National Vision, its corporate benefactor, ended their association over concerns about corporate branding in health care, following a campaign by NSU-College of Optometry alumni.
