= Johannes Vieweg =

American medical school dean

Johannes W. Vieweg, M.D.
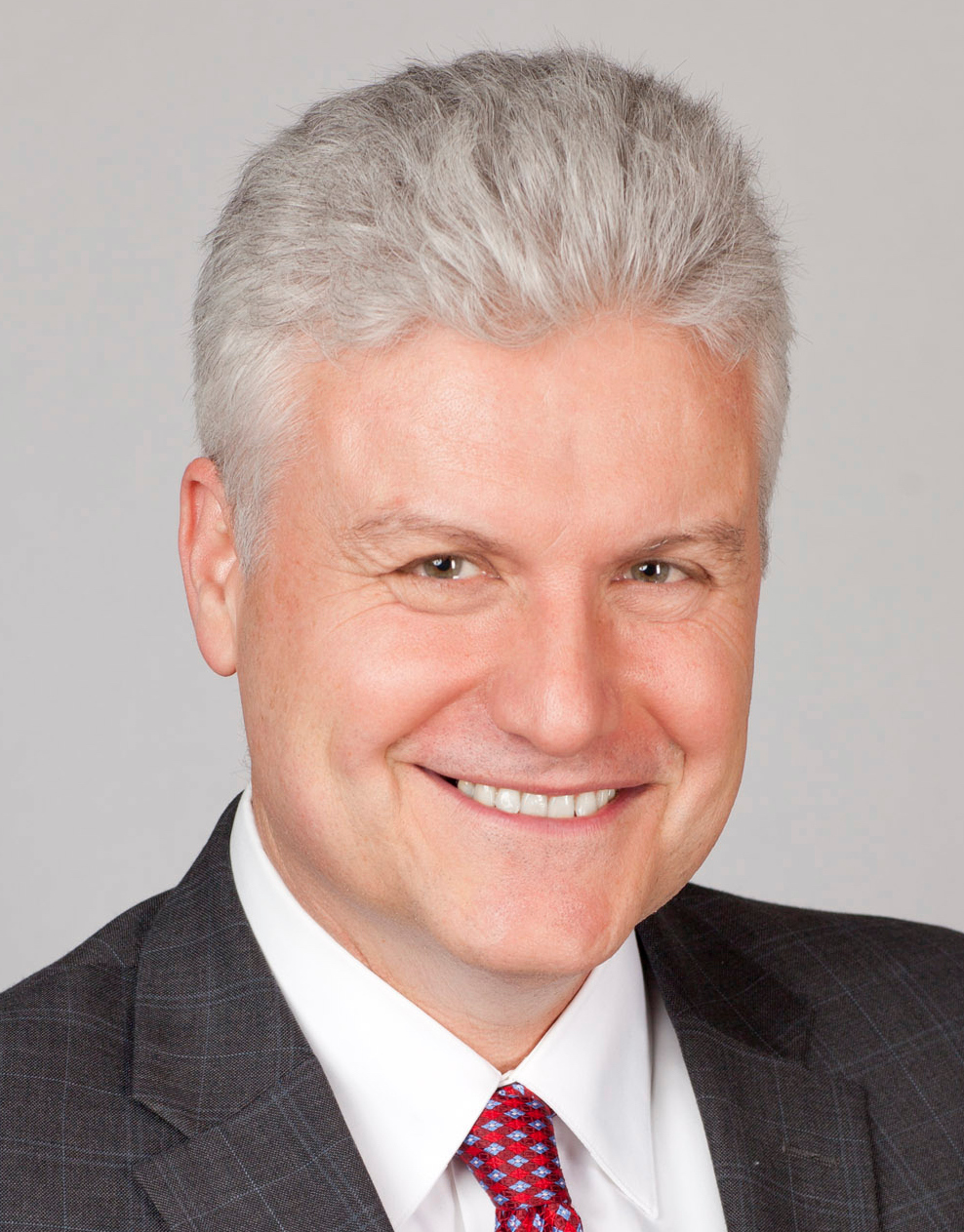
- Education: M.D. Technical University of Munich; Residency Duke University School of Medicine
- Known for: Founding Dean, Dr. Kiran C. Patel College of Allopathic Medicine, Nova Southeastern University

Johannes W. Vieweg is an American medical school dean, university professor, and physician-scientist, presently residing in the city of Fort Lauderdale, Florida.

== Early life and education ==
Vieweg received his medical degree from the Technical University of Munich in 1983. After moving to the United States in 1991, he spent three years as a post-doctoral research fellow at Memorial Sloan-Kettering Cancer Center and Duke Universityunder the mentorship of Eli Gilboa, a prominent expert in retrovirology and cell therapy.

== Professional background ==
In 1999, Vieweg completed the Duke residency-training program in urologic surgery, and subsequently, enjoyed highly productive nine-year tenure as faculty and vice chair of Research in the Duke Department of Urology under the chairmanship of David F. Paulson. Much of Vieweg's career-long scientific activity has centered on the investigation and clinical testing of genetically engineered tumor vaccines, the discovery of universal tumor antigens, and the modulation of immunosuppressive T-cells and myeloid cells. He also made significant contributions by discovering novel pathway-targeted interventions and developing novel prediction models for therapeutic response. Recent research interests are aligned with the field of public health, prevention medicine, implementation science and comparative effectiveness research in academic and community-based settings. Vieweg's scientific work has received uninterrupted funding by the National Institute of Health since 1998, and it is documented in more than 180 publications, books, commentaries and review articles.

In 2006, Vieweg was recruited to the University of Florida (UF) as the founding professor and Chairman of the Department of Urology. Vieweg's recruitment from Duke University to UF was facilitated by the Florida Board of Governors’ 21st Century World Class Scholar's program, which recognizes nationally accomplished faculty in the areas of science, technology, engineering, and mathematics (STEM). Other positions held by Vieweg during his 10-year tenure at UF included the Wayne and Marti Huizenga Endowed Research Scholar Chair, executive director of the UF Prostate Disease Center, chairman of the Florida Prostate Cancer Advisory Council, and vice president of the University of Florida Clinical Practice Association.

During his tenure at UF, Vieweg served as the American Urologic Association Research Council Chair from 2010 to 2015.

In February 2015, Vieweg was awarded a Jefferson Science Fellowship by the National Academy of Sciences in Washington DC. This prestigious program engages distinguished scientists from across the U.S. as special advisors to the U.S. Department of State to provide scientific expertise in foreign policy development. In this position, Vieweg frequently interacted with numerous Department of State offices and governmental agencies, including the U.S. .Department of Health and Human Services and the National Science Foundation on issues of global health, health education, and health security. He frequently participated in diplomatic meetings with foreign governments to advance partnerships and implement foreign policy for the United States of America.

== Current position and responsibilities ==
From February 2016 through December 2024, Johannes Vieweg served as the Inaugural Dean and Chief Academic Officer of the College of Allopathic Medicine at Nova Southeastern University (NSU) in Fort Lauderdale, Florida. The college received preliminary LCME accreditation in October 2017 and matriculated its inaugural class in July 2018.
After receiving a substantial gift from the Patel Family Foundation in January 2018, the college was renamed the Dr. Kiran C. Patel College of Allopathic Medicine. In 2021, the college was awarded provisional accreditation status by LCME.

From 2017 to 2021, Vieweg was recognized among the South Florida Power Leaders in Healthcare. Vieweg left his position in December 2024. Following his departure, Chad Perlyn, M.D., Ph.D., M.B.A, NSU's Chief Medical Officer, was named dean.
