= List of Antillian and Bermudan species extinct in the Holocene =

Admiralty chart of the West Indies, with Bermuda northwest

This is a list of Antillian and Bermudan animals extinct in the Holocene that covers extinctions from the Holocene epoch, a geologic epoch that began about 11,650 years before present (about 9700 BCE) (Note: The source gives "11,700 calendar yr b2k (before CE 2000)". But "BP" means "before CE 1950". Therefore, the Holocene began 11,650 BP. Doing the math, that is c. 9700 BCE.) and continues to the present day. This list includes the Antilles archipelago and the Bermuda Islands, collectively known as the West Indies, though the Florida Keys and Cozumel are included in the list of North American species extinct in the Holocene due to their geographic and geological proximity to the continent.

The indigenous fauna of the West Indies collapsed in the Late Quaternary, with the rate of extinction for terrestrial mammals approaching 79-84%, one of the highest in the world. However, in stark contrast to the American continent, radiocarbon dating indicates that mammals survived the end of the Pleistocene with no apparent, or minimal losses despite localized sea level rise and climate change. The same actually caused some bird extirpations and extinctions on the Bahamas, however.

The indigenous peoples of the Caribbean arrived in the middle Holocene and introduced guinea pigs, agoutis, and Native American dogs. While they accelerated the process, it was still not to the extent predicted by the "blitzkrieg" model of Pleistocene extinctions. For example, Caribbean sloths coexisted with humans for up to 400 years, even the largest species, which might indicate that they weren't commonly hunted. Some rodents, like the Puerto Rican hutia and Desmarest's hutia, and even flightless birds like the Antillean cave rail adapted well to human predation and were introduced to new islands by humans. European colonization, beginning with the arrival of Christopher Columbus in 1492, brought in Old World rats, mice, domestic animals, and large-scale deforestation that eradicated many of the native animals and those introduced by indigenous peoples alike. The most recent extinctions happened after the late 19th century, following the introduction of the small Indian mongoose for rat control.

Many extinction dates are unknown due to a lack of relevant information.

== Mammals (class Mammalia) ==
=== Anteaters and sloths (order Pilosa) ===
==== Antillian sloths (family Megalocnidae) ====
Common name	Scientific name	Range	Comments	Pictures
Cuban sloth	Acratocnus antillensis	Cuba	Most recent remains dated to 5050-4050 BCE.	Acratocnus antillensis
Puerto Rican sloth	Acratocnus odontrigonus	Puerto Rico	Most recent remains dated to 1738–1500 BCE. However this date was not obtained directly from bones, nor calibrated, and the remains could be older.	
	Acratocnus simorhynchus	Hispaniola	Known from the Pleistocene but possibly reached the Holocene due to later human arrival in the island.	
Haitian Macaya sloth	Acratocnus ye	Hispaniola	Most recent remains dated to 8540–1590 BCE (uncalibrated age).	
Cuban giant sloth	Megalocnus rodens	Cuba	Most recent remains dated to 2280-2200 BCE.	Megalocnus rodens
Lesser Haitian ground sloth	Neocnus comes	Hispaniola	Most recent remains dated to 2480–2400 BCE.	Neocnus comes
Haitian pine forest sloth	Neocnus dousman	Hispaniola	Most recent remains dated to 5226-5156 BCE.	Neocnus comes
Cuban rodent-like sloth	Neocnus gliriformis	Cuba	Most recent remains dated to 5050-4050 BCE.	Neocnus comes
	Neocnus major	Cuba	Known from remains dating to either the late Pleistocene or early Holocene. Possibly a synonym of N. gliriformis, with differences owing to sexual dimorphism, but this is rejected by other researchers.	Neocnus comes
Haitian rak bwa sloth	Neocnus toupiti	Massif de la Hotte, Haiti	Most recent remains dated to 8540–1590 BCE (uncalibrated age).	Neocnus comes
	Paulocnus petrifactus	Curaçao	Known from the Pleistocene but possibly reached the Holocene due to later human arrival in the island.	
Matthew's ground sloth	Parocnus brownii	Cuba	Most recent remains dated to 3290-2730 BCE.	
	Parocnus dominicanus	Southeastern Dominican Republic	Known from remains dating to either the late Pleistocene or early Holocene.	
Greater Haitian ground sloth	Parocnus serus	Hispaniola, Tortuga, and Gonâve Island	Most recent remains dated to 8540–1590 BCE (uncalibrated age).	

=== Rodents (order Rodentia) ===
==== Neotropical spiny rats (family Echimyidae) ====
Common name	Scientific name	Range	Comments	Pictures
Oriente cave rat	Boromys offella	Cuba	Most recent remains dated to 7043-6503 BCE.	
Torre's cave rat	Boromys torrei	Cuba	Most recent remains dated to 7043-6503 BCE.	
	Brotomys contractus	Hispaniola	Known from the Pleistocene, but might have survived into the Holocene due to humans arriving in the island later.	
Hispaniolan edible rat	Brotomys voratus	Hispaniola	Most recent remains dated to 1550-1670 CE.	
	Capromys antiquus	Cuba	Known from the Pleistocene, but might have survived into the Holocene due to humans arriving in the island later.	
	Capromys arredondoi	Cuba	Known from the Pleistocene, but might have survived into the Holocene due to humans arriving in the island later.	
	Capromys latus	Cuba	Known from the Pleistocene, but might have survived into the Holocene due to humans arriving in the island later.	
	Capromys pappus	Cuba	Known from the Pleistocene, but might have survived into the Holocene due to humans arriving in the island later.	
	Capromys pilorides lewisi	Grand Cayman, Cayman Brac, and Little Cayman, Cayman Islands	Most recently dated in Grand Cayman to 1439-1643 and in Cayman Brac to 1440–1624. A 1585 reference by Francis Drake to "coneys" and cat-sized "little beasts" on the islands could refer to this animal.	
	Capromys robustus	Cuba	Known from the Pleistocene, but might have survived into the Holocene due to humans arriving in the island later.	
	Geocapromys caymanensis	Grand Cayman and Cayman Brac, Cayman Islands	Most recently dated at Cayman Brac to 666-857 CE.	
Cuban coney	Geocapromys columbianus	Cuba	Known from subfossil remains associated with anthropogenically introduced mammalian species. Extinct after European contact.	
	Geocapromys pleistocenicus	Cuba	Most recent remains dated to 7043-6503 BCE.	
Little Swan Island hutia	Geocapromys thoracatus	Little Swan Island, Honduras	Last recorded in the early 1950s. It disappeared due to predation by cats introduced around the same time, though a hurricane in 1955 may have speeded up the process.	
Antillean cave rat	Heteropsomys antillensis	Puerto Rico	Possibly extinct after European contact.	
Insular cave rat	Heteropsomys insulans	Puerto Rico	Most recent remains dated to 772–870 CE.	
Imposter hutia	Hexolobodon phenax	Hispaniola	Extinct after European contact. Remains possibly associated with anthropogenically introduced mammalian species.	
	Hexolobodon sp.	Southern Hispaniola	Most recent remains dated to 2835-1691 BCE, but possibly disappeared after European contact.	
Montane hutia	Isolobodon montanus	Hispaniola	Subfossil remains associated with anthropogenically introduced mammalian species. Extinct after European contact.	
Puerto Rican hutia	Isolobodon portoricensis	Hispaniola and Gonâve	Domesticated to some extent by Native Americans and introduced to Puerto Rico, Mona Island, Vieques, and the Virgin Islands. Likely one of the animals mentioned by Gonzalo Fernández de Oviedo y Valdés in 1535. Most recent remains in Puerto Real, Haiti were dated stratigraphically to 1503-1578, and in Mona to 1480-1655.	
	Macrocapromys acevedo	Cuba	Most recent remains dated to around 450 BCE.	
	Mesocapromys barbouri	Cuba	Extinct in the late Pleistocene or early Holocene.	
	Mesocapromys beatrizae	Cuba	Extinct in the late Pleistocene or early Holocene.	
	Mesocapromys delicatus	Cuba	Known from the Pleistocene, but might have survived into the Holocene due to humans arriving in the island later.	
	Mesocapromys gracilis	Cuba	Extinct in the late Pleistocene or early Holocene.	
	Mesocapromys kraglievichi	Cuba	Most recent remains dated after around 450 BCE.	
	Mesocapromys minimus	Cuba	Extinct in the late Pleistocene or early Holocene.	
	Mysateles jaumei	Cuba	Known from the Pleistocene, but might have survived into the Holocene due to humans arriving in the island later.	
	Plagiodontia araeum	Hispaniola	Extinct in the Holocene.	
Samana hutia	Plagiodontia ipnaeum	Hispaniola	Extinct after European contact. Subfossil remains were found in archaeological sites associated with anthropogenically introduced mammalian species. It was possibly recorded as the quemi by Fernández de Oviedo between 1536 and 1546, and under the name comadrejainto the 20th century, though this late survival is unlikely.	
	Puertoricomys corozalus	Puerto Rico	Known from the Pleistocene, but might have survived into the Holocene due to humans arriving in the island later.	
Lemke's hutia	Rhizoplagiodontia lemkei	Massif de la Hotte, Haiti	Most recent remains dated to 2835-1691 BCE, but possibly disappeared after European contact.	
Woods' zagouti	Zagoutomys woodsi	Haiti	Most recent remains dated to 5474-5330 BCE.	

===== Possibly extinct =====
Common name	Scientific name	Range	Comments	Pictures
Dwarf hutia	Mesocapromys nanus	Ciénaga de Zapata, Cuba	Last collected in 1951; a nest and pellets were found in 1978. The species is threatened by introduced predators (black rat, feral dog, feral cat, mongoose), fires (sometimes set for mosquito control), and deforestation for charcoal production.	
San Felipe hutia	Mesocapromys sanfelipensis	Key Juan García, Cuba	Last collected in 1978. It likely declined due to hunting after a military base was built on the island, fires set up by fishermen (both accidentally and for mosquito control), and predation by introduced black rats, cats, and dogs.	

==== Giant hutias (family Heptaxodontidae) ====
Common name	Scientific name	Range	Comments
Osborn's key mouse	Clidomys osborni	Jamaica	Known from the Pleistocene, but might have survived to the Holocene due to humans arriving later in the island.
Plate-toothed giant hutia	Elasmodontomys obliquus	Puerto Rico	Most recent remains dated to 511–407 BCE.
Twisted-toothed mouse	Quemisia gravis	Hispaniola	Extinct after European contact. Although not dated, remains were found along with introduced Rattus and there are probable references to it in early colonial literature.
	Tainotherium valei	Puerto Rico	Known from an undated femur from either the late Pleistocene or early Holocene. Its morphology suggests arboreality, making unlikely that it became extinct when forests expanded in the Holocene. It might have become extinct due to human-induced habitat loss instead.
Diminute Jamaican hutia	Xaymaca fulvopulvis	Jamaica	Most recent remains dated to 9390–8220 BCE.

==== Hamsters, voles, lemmings, muskrats, and New World rats and mice (family Cricetidae) ====
Common name	Scientific name	Range	Comments	Pictures
	Ekbletomys hypenemus	Antigua and Barbuda	Known from subfossil remains associated with anthropogenically introduced mammal species.	
Barbuda giant rice rat	Megalomys audreyae	Barbuda	Most recent remains dated to 1173–1385 CE.	
	Megalomys curazensis	Curaçao	Known from the Pleistocene, but may have reached the Holocene due to humans arriving to the island later.	
Martinique giant rice rat	Megalomys desmarestii	Martinique	Last recorded in 1897. Presumed to have become extinct as a result of mongoose predation, or the 1902 eruption of Mount Pelée.	
Saint Lucia giant rice rat	Megalomys luciae	Saint Lucia	Last recorded before 1881. Likely extinct because of predation by introduced mongooses.	
	Megalomys sp.	Anguilla	Extinct after European contact.	
	Megalomys sp.	Antigua	Extinct after European contact.	
Saint Vincent pygmy rice rat	Oligoryzomys victus	Saint Vincent	Last recorded before 1892. Probably extinct due to predation by introduced black rats, brown rats, or mongooses.	
Jamaican rice rat	Oryzomys antillarum	Jamaica	Last recorded in 1877, five years after the introduction of mongooses.	
	Oryzomys curasoae	Curaçao	Extinct after European contact.	
	Oryzomys hypenemus	Antigua and Barbuda	Extinct after European contact.	
	Oryzomys sp.	Barbados	Last recorded before 1890.	
	Oryzomys spp.	Grenada	Two different species extinct after European contact.	
Nevis rice rat	Pennatomys nivalis	Saint Kitts and Nevis and Sint Eustatius	Described from subfossil remains. Historical references to an "unusual-looking", edible rat from the colonial period to the 1930s may refer to this species. It likely disappeared due to predation by introduced black rats or mongooses.	
	Thomasomys sp.	Bonaire	Known from the Pleistocene, but may have survived until the Holocene due to humans arriving to the island later.	
	Oryzomyini indet.	Bonaire	Known from the Pleistocene, but may have survived until the Holocene due to humans arriving to the island later.	
	Oryzomyini indet.	Carriacou	Most recent remains at Grand Bay dated to 390-1280.	
	Oryzomyini indet.	Guadeloupe	Most recent remains at Morel dated to 21-881.	
	Oryzomyini indet.	La Desirade	Most recent remains at Petit Rivière dated to 600-1400.	
	Oryzomyini indet.	Marie-Galante	Most recent remains at Taliseronde dated to 350-665.	
	Oryzomyini indet.	Montserrat	Two unnamed species, both most recently dated at Trants to 774 BCE - 622 AD.	
	Oryzomyini indet.	Saba	Most recent remains at Kelby's Ridge II dated to 1290-1400.	

=== Primates (order Primates) ===
==== Titis, sakis, and uakaris (family Pitheciidae) ====
Common name	Scientific name	Range	Comments
Hispaniola monkey	Antillothrix bernensis	Hispaniola	Most recent remains dated to 2035–1735 BCE. Possible monkey depictions in petroglyphs, indigenous pottery and other artifacts of Cuba and Hispaniola may indicate later survival, though its archaeological association with European-introduced Mus and Rattus at Trouing, Haiti is unlikely.
La Hotte monkey	Insulacebus toussaintiana	Massif de la Hotte, Haiti	Described from undated remains, but presumed to be late Holocene because of its state of conservation similar to the other species.
Cuban monkey	Paralouatta varonai	Cuba	Known from the Pleistocene but possibly reached the Holocene due to humans arriving in the island later.
Jamaican monkey	Xenothrix mcgregori	Jamaica	Most recent remains dated to 439–473 CE.

=== True insectivores (order Eulipotyphla) ===
==== West Indies shrews (family Nesophontidae) ====
Common name	Scientific name	Range	Comments	Pictures
Puerto Rican nesophontes	Nesophontes edithae	Puerto Rico	Most recently dated to 1015–1147 CE but believed extinct after European contact. No nesophontes species was hunted as they were too small.	
Cayman nesophontes	Nesophontes hemicingulus	Grand Cayman and Cayman Brac, Cayman Islands	Most recently dated at Cayman Brac to 666–857 CE but believed extinct after European contact.	
Atalaye nesophontes	Nesophontes hypomicrus	Hispaniola	Most recently dated to 1175–1295 CE but believed extinct after European contact.	
Greater Cuban nesophontes	Nesophontes major	Cuba	Most recent remains dated to around 10 BCE at Cueva de los Nesofontes, but believed extinct after European contact.	
Western Cuban nesophontes	Nesophontes micrus	Cuba	Most recently dated to 1310–1410 CE but believed extinct after European contact.	
St. Michel nesophontes	Nesophontes paramicrus	Hispaniola	Most recently dated to 1265–1400 CE but believed extinct after European contact.	
Haitian nesophontes	Nesophontes zamicrus	Hispaniola	Most recently dated to 1295–1430 CE but believed extinct after European contact.	

==== Solenodons (family Solenodontidae) ====
Common name	Scientific name	Range	Comments
Giant solenodon	Atopogale arredondoi	Cuba	Extinct in the late Pleistocene or early Holocene.
Marcano's solenodon	Solenodon marcanoi	Hispaniola	Extinct after European contact.
Ottenwalder's solenodon	Solenodon ottenwalderi	Tiburon Peninsula, Haiti	Most recent remains dated to the Pleistocene-Holocene boundary.

=== Bats (order Chiroptera) ===
==== Mustached, ghost-faced, and naked-backed bats (family Mormoopidae) ====
Common name	Scientific name	Range	Comments
Giant ghost-faced bat	Mormoops magna	Cuba and Hispaniola	Most recent remains dated to 7043–6503 BCE.
Pristine mustached bat	Pteronotus pristinus	Cuba and Florida	Known from the Pleistocene, but may have survived into the Holocene of Cuba due to humans arriving in the island later.

===== Locally extinct =====
Common name	Scientific name	Range	Comments	Pictures
Ghost-faced bat	Mormoops megalophylla	Mexico to Trinidad and the Ecuadorian Andes	Most recent remains in Cuba dated near European arrival.	
Macleay's mustached bat	Pteronotus macleayi	Cuba, Jamaica, Bahamas, and Hispaniola	Extirpated from Bahamas and Hispaniola, but survives in Cuba and Jamaica.	

==== Leaf-nosed bats (family Phyllostomidae) ====
Common name	Scientific name	Range	Comments	Pictures
Anthony's fruit-eating bat	Artibeus anthonyi	Cuba	Most recent remains dated to 1957–1993 CE.	
	Cubanycteris silvai	Cuba	Known from the Pleistocene, but may have survived into the Holocene due to humans arriving in the island later.	
Puerto Rican long-nosed bat	Monophyllus plethodon frater	Puerto Rico	Possibly extinct between 1851 and 1900 as a result of extensive clearing for agriculture.	
Puerto Rican flower bat	Phyllonycteris major	Puerto Rico and Antigua	Most recent remains dated to around 1500 BCE at Burma Quarry, Antigua.	
Silva's fig-eating bat	Phyllops silvai	Cuba	Known from the Pleistocene, but may have survived into the Holocene due to humans arriving in the island later.	
Lesser falcate-winged bat	Phyllops vetus	Cuba and Juventud	Most recent remains dated to around 10 BCE at Cueva de los Nesofontes, Cuba.	

===== Locally extinct =====
Common name	Scientific name	Range	Comments	Pictures
Common vampire bat	Desmodus rotundus	From Mexico and Cuba to Uruguay	Most recent remains in Cuba dated to 1957–1993 CE.	

=== Carnivorans (order Carnivora) ===
==== Earless seals (family Phocidae) ====
Common name	Scientific name	Range	Comments	Pictures
Caribbean monk seal	Neomonachus tropicalis	Caribbean Sea, Bahamas, and Gulf of Mexico	Last recorded at Serranilla Bank in 1952. It was hunted for its skin, oil, and to remove competition for fishermen.	

== Birds (class Aves) ==
=== Nightjars (order Caprimulgiformes) ===
==== Typical nightjars (family Caprimulgidae) ====
Common name	Scientific name	Range	Comments
Cuban pauraque	Siphonorhis daiquiri	Cuba	Most recent remains dated to 7043–6507 BCE.

===== Possibly extinct =====
Common name	Scientific name	Range	Comments	Pictures
Jamaican poorwill	Siphonorhis americana	Jamaica	Last recorded in 1860. Probably extinct due to habitat destruction, predation by introduced mongooses and rats.	

=== Swifts, treeswifts, and hummingbirds (order Apodiformes) ===
==== Hummingbirds (family Trochillidae) ====
Common name	Scientific name	Range	Comments	Pictures
	Anthracothorax sp.	Bahamas	Extinct in the Holocene.	
	Mellisuga sp.	Bahamas	Extinct in the Holocene.	
Brace's emerald	Riccordia bracei	New Providence, Bahamas	Only known from the holotype collected in 1877, though subfossil bones of hummingbirds found in the island probably belong to the same species. The causes of extinction are unknown but presumably human-induced.	
Gould's emerald	Riccordia elegans	unknown; possibly Jamaica or the northern Bahamas	Only known from the holotype collected in 1860. The reasons of extinction are unknown.	
Bell's woodnymph	Thalurania belli	High forested mountains of Dominica	Only known from George Elliott Verrill's 1905 description.	

=== Pigeons and doves (order Columbiformes) ===
==== Pigeons and doves (family Columbidae) ====
Common name	Scientific name	Range	Comments	Pictures
Puerto Rican quail-dove	Geotrygon larva	Puerto Rico	Known from subfossil remains, extinct after human settlement.	

=== Rails and cranes (order Gruiformes) ===
==== Rails (family Rallidae) ====
Common name	Scientific name	Range	Comments
Jamaican wood rail	Amaurolimnas concolor concolor	Jamaica	Last collected in 1881. Mongoose predation has been suggested as the cause of extinction, but the species coexisted with mongooses, cats, and rats for a prolonged time.
	Rallus sp.	Bahamas	Undescribed species extinct in the Holocene.
	Rallus or Porzana sp.	Bahamas	Undescribed species extinct in the Holocene.

==== Cave rails (family Nesotrochidae) ====
Common name	Scientific name	Range	Comments	Pictures
Antillean cave rail	Nesotrochis debooyi	Puerto Rico	Described from subfossil remains in Pre-Columbian kitchen middens, though a 1943 report of a "flightless hen" in Virgin Gorda could have been this species. It was introduced to Mona and the Virgin Islands by indigenous peoples.	
Cuban cave rail	Nesotrochis picapicensis	Cuba	Present in post-Columbian cave deposits of Mayabeque.	
Haitian cave rail	Nesotrochis steganinos	Hispaniola	Most recent remains dated to 5474-5339 BCE.	

==== Cranes (family Gruidae) ====
Common name	Scientific name	Range	Comments	Pictures
Cuban flightless crane	Antigone cubensis	Cuba	Known from Late Quaternary remains. (Note: This and many other species in this source have no datation beyond "Late Quaternary"; some may actually represent Pleistocene extinctions. Nevertheless, the author considers that "[m]ost species seem to have become extinct in Cuba, probably during the Late Holocene.")	
	Grus sp.	Bahamas	Undescribed species, extinct in the Holocene.	

===== Locally extinct =====
Common name	Scientific name	Range	Comments	Pictures
Sandhill crane	Antigone canadensis	Chukotka Autonomous Okrug, Russia to northern Mexico, Cuba, and Bahamas	Extirpated from Bahamas in the Holocene but survives in western Cuba and Juventud.	

=== Shorebirds (order Charadriiformes) ===
==== Thick-knees (family Burhinidae) ====
Common name	Scientific name	Range	Comments
Dwarf thick-knee	Burhinus nanus	Bahamas	Most recent remains in the Middle Caicos dated to 1460-1660 CE. Sometimes considered a subspecies of the double-striped thick-knee.

===== Locally extinct =====
Common name	Scientific name	Range	Comments	Pictures
Double-striped thick-knee	Burhinus bistriatus	Central America, northern South America and the Caribbean	Extirpated from Cuba, where it is known from Late Quaternary remains. Survives in parts of Hispaniola, Trinidad and Tobago. May occur as vagrant in Barbados.	

==== Sandpipers (family Scolopacidae) ====
Common name	Scientific name	Range	Comments
Bahama snipe	Gallinago kakuki	Greater Antilles, Bahamas, and Caymans	Known from Late Quaternary remains. Reached the Holocene in Bahamas for certain.
Puerto Rico woodcock	Scolopax anthonyi	Puerto Rico	Known from subfossil remains.
Hispaniola woodcock	Scolopax brachycarpa	Hispaniola	Most recent remains at Trouing Jean Paul, Haiti dated to 1270–1380 CE.

===== Possibly extinct =====
Common name	Scientific name	Range	Comments	Pictures
Eskimo curlew	Numenius borealis	Americas	Last collected in Barbados in 1963. Declined due to hunting, conversion of prairies for agriculture, and the suppression of the fire regime.	

=== Albatrosses and petrels (order Procellariiformes) ===
==== Petrels and shearwaters (family Procellariidae) ====
===== Possibly extinct =====
Common name	Scientific name	Range	Comments	Pictures
Jamaican petrel	Pterodroma caribbaea	Jamaica; possibly Dominica, Guadeloupe, and Bahamas	Last recorded with certainty in 1879. An unconfirmed sighting was made west of Bimini, Bahamas in 1936. It was hunted with dogs in its only known breeding site, the Blue Mountains of Jamaica. The extinct status is hard to ascertain as it is a nocturnal and dark-colored sea bird.	

=== Storks and allies (order Ciconiiformes) ===
==== Storks (family Ciconiidae) ====
Common name	Scientific name	Range	Comments	Pictures
Asphalt stork	Ciconia lydekkeri	Contiguous United States to Argentina	Known from Late Quaternary remains in Cienfuegos, Cuba.	
	Ciconia sp.	Las Breas de San Felipe, Matanzas, Cuba	Remains not dated directly; the site is dated to 10350-2730 BCE.	
Wetmore's stork	Mycteria wetmorei	Southern United States and Cuba	Remains found in San Felipe along with Ciconia sp.	

=== Pelicans, herons, and ibises (order Pelecaniformes) ===
==== Ibises and spoonbills (family Threskiornithidae) ====
Common name	Scientific name	Range	Comments	Pictures
Jamaican ibis	Xenicibis xympithecus	Jamaica	Most recent remains at Long Mile Cave dated to 787 BCE – 320 CE.	

==== Herons (family Ardeidae) ====
Common name	Scientific name	Range	Comments	Pictures
Bermuda night heron	Nyctanassa carcinocatactes	Bermuda	Last recorded in 1610. Likely extinct due to introduced cats, hunting, and perhaps shortage of prey.	

===== Locally extinct =====
Common name	Scientific name	Range	Comments	Pictures
Bare-throated tiger heron	Tigrisoma mexicanum	Coastal Central America and Cuba	Extirpated from Cuba, where Late Quaternary remains are known (possibly representing an endemic subspecies).	

=== New World vultures (order Cathartiformes) ===
==== New World vultures and condors (family Cathartidae) ====
Common name	Scientific name	Range	Comments
Emslie's vulture	Cathartes emsliei	Cuba	Most recent remains at Las Breas de San Felipe dated to 10350-2730 BCE. The island was colonized by the turkey vulture (Cathartes aura) and the black vulture (Coragyps atratus) after its extinction.
	cf. Cathartes sp.	Cuba	A different Late Quaternary species, likely belonging to another genus.
Cuban condor	Gymnogyps varonai	Cuba	Known from Late Quaternary remains.

==== Teratorns (family Teratornithidae) ====
Common name	Scientific name	Range	Comments
Cuban teratorn	Oscaravis olsoni	Cuba	Known from Late Quaternary remains.

=== Hawks and relatives (order Accipitriformes) ===
==== Hawks, eagles, kites, harriers and Old World vultures (family Accipitridae) ====
Common name	Scientific name	Range	Comments	Pictures
Woodward's eagle	Amplibuteo woodwardi	California to Florida and the Caribbean	Known from Late Quaternary remains.	
	Accipiter sp.	Bahamas	Undescribed species extinct in the Holocene, known from fossil remains.	
Bermuda hawk	Bermuteo avivorus	Bermuda	Last recorded in 1603. Possibly extinct due to hunting and predation by introduced mammals including feral pigs.	
	Buteo quadratus	Bahamas	Extinct in the Holocene.	
Cuban titan-hawk	Buteogallus borrasi	Cuba	Most recent remains dated to 5050-4050 BCE.	
Suarez's giant eagle	Gigantohierax suarezi	Cuba	Known from Late Quaternary remains.	

===== Locally extinct =====
Common name	Scientific name	Range	Comments	Images
Red-shouldered hawk	Buteo lineatus	Northeastern Mexico, eastern United States and Canada, Cuba, and Bahamas	Extirpated from the Caribbean, where they are known from Late Quaternary remains.	
Black-chested buzzard-eagle	Geranoaetus melanoleucus	South America and Cuba	Extirpated from the Caribbean, where they are known from Late Quaternary remains.	

=== Owls (order Strigiformes) ===
==== True owls (family Strigidae) ====
Common name	Scientific name	Range	Comments	Pictures
Bermuda saw-whet owl	Aegolius gradyi	Bermuda	Last recorded in 1609–1610. Likely extinct due to habitat destruction and introduced predatory mammals.	
Antiguan burrowing owl	Athene cunicularia amaura	Antigua, Nevis, and St. Kitts	Extinct in the late 19th century.	
Guadeloupe burrowing owl	Athene cunicularia guadeloupensis	Marie-Galante Island off Guadeloupe	Disappeared in the late 19th century, soon after mongooses were introduced to the island.	
Cuban horned owl	Bubo osvaldoi	Cuba	Known from Late Quaternary remains.	
Cuban cursorial owl	Ornimegalonyx oteroi	Cuba	Most recent remains dated to 5050-4050 BCE. The species O. acevedoi, O. minor, and O. gigas are likely the same and represent only size differences due to sexual dimorphism, chrono-temporal or individual variation.	
Cuban spectacled owl	Pulsatrix arredondoi	Cuba	Most recent remains dated to 530–590 CE.	

===== Possibly extinct =====
Common name	Scientific name	Range	Comments	Pictures
Virgin Islands screech owl	Gymnasio nudipes newtoni	Virgin Islands	Last confirmed record in 1936 in Saint Croix, with an unconfirmed one on Guana Island in 1985. Likely extinct due to forest clearance for agriculture.	

==== Barn-owls (family Tytonidae) ====
Common name	Scientific name	Range	Comments	Pictures
Puerto Rican barn owl	Tyto cavatica	Puerto Rico	Described from subfossil remains. 1912 reports of cave-nesting owls may refer to this species.	
Craves's giant barn owl	Tyto cravesae	Western Cuba	Known from subfossil remains.	
Noel's barn owl	Tyto noeli	Cuba, Jamaica, and Barbuda	Most recent remains at Drum Cave, Jamaica dated to 1900–1600 BCE. Extinct due to deforestation, invasive animals, and loss of prey.	
Hispaniolan giant barn owl	Tyto ostologa	Haiti and southern Dominican Republic	A 1788 description of a call and feathers at Pic la Selle may refer to this species. There was also an unconfirmed sighting in the 1970s.	
Bahaman giant barn owl	Tyto pollens	Cuba and Bahamas	Described from subfossil remains but may have survived until the 16th century.	
	Tyto sp.	Pinar del Río, Cuba	A small, undescribed species known from Late Quaternary remains.	

=== Falcons (order Falconiformes) ===
==== Falcons and caracaras (family Falconidae) ====
Common name	Scientific name	Range	Comments	Pictures
Bahaman caracara	Caracara creightoni	Cuba and Bahamas	Most recent remains dated in Bahamas to 470-410 BCE, and in Cuba to 290-430 CE.	
Puerto Rican caracara	Caracara latebrosus	Puerto Rico	Known from subfossil remains.	
Jamaican caracara	Caracara tellustris	Jamaica	Most recent remains dated to 4570 BCE - 130 CE.	
	Caracara sp.	Bahamas	Undescribed second caracara species, extinct in the Holocene.	
Cuban kestrel	Falco kurochkini	Cuba	Known from Late Quaternary remains.	
	Milvago carbo	Cuba	Known from Late Quaternary remains at the San Felipe tar pits.	
	Milvago sp.	Cuba	Similar to the Yellow-headed caracara. Known from fragmentary Late Quaternary remains at the San Felipe tar pits.	

===== Locally extinct =====
Common name	Scientific name	Range	Comments	Pictures
Aplomado falcon	Falco femoralis	New Mexico to Patagonia	Extirpated from Cuba, where it is known from Late Quaternary remains, and Bahamas, where it reached the Holocene for certain.	

=== Woodpeckers and allies (order Piciformes) ===
==== Woodpeckers (family Picidae) ====
Common name	Scientific name	Range	Comments
Bermuda flicker	Colaptes oceanicus	Bermuda	Last recorded in 1623; the decimation of local birds by feral cats was also noted.

===== Possibly extinct =====
Common name	Scientific name	Range	Comments	Pictures
Cuban ivory-billed woodpecker	Campephilus principalis bairdii	Cuba	Last confirmed record in 1987. Possible calls were heard on the Sierra Maestra in 1998, but the area is considered too high and outside the historical range of this species.	

=== Parrots (order Psittaciformes) ===
==== Holotropical parrots (family Psittacidae) ====
Common name	Scientific name	Range	Comments	Pictures
Aruba amazon	Amazona barbadensis canifrons	Aruba	Presumed extinct between 1944 and 1947 due to poisoning by fruit farmers and capture for the exotic pet trade, though it might have survived after this date. There are also doubts about the validity of this subspecies due to variability within the yellow-shouldered amazon species.	
Martinique amazon	Amazona martinicana	Martinique	Last recorded in 1779. They were intensely hunted for their meat.	
Guadeloupe amazon	Amazona violacea	Guadeloupe	Last recorded in 1779. They were intensely hunted for their meat.	
Culebra Island amazon	Amazona vittata gracilipes	Culebra Island of Puerto Rico	Last collected in 1899. Likely extinct due to persecution as a crop pest and increased mortality by hurricanes as a consequence of deforestation. Another extinct population on Vieques may be a different, undescribed subspecies.	
	Amazona sp.	Antigua	Most recent remains dated to around 1500 BCE at Burma Quarry.	
St. Croix macaw	Ara autocthones	Puerto Rico and Saint Croix	Known from pre-Columbian subfossil remains.	
Lesser Antillean macaw	Ara guadeloupensis	Guadeloupe	Last recorded in Guadeloupe in 1742. Known mostly from written accounts, illustrations, and possible subfossil remains. A 1779 plate possibly represents a captive animal in Europe.	
Martinique macaw	Ara martinicus	Martinique	Hypothetical species only known from a short 1630s description by Jesuit Jacques Bouton, though another short 1658 description of "Ara erythrura" is likely the same animal. Some authors consider these introduced blue-and-yellow macaws from South America, while others identify a slightly different macaw painted by Roelant Savery in 1626 as a representation of this species and thus evidence that it actually existed. However, there is no information about the origin of the bird depicted by Savery.	
Cuban macaw	Ara tricolor	Cuba and Juventud	Last animals were shot (with reservations) in central Cuba in 1889. Probably extinct due to hunting (though it was recorded as foul-tasting), capture as pets, and habitat destruction. The Jamaican red macaw ("Ara gossei"), named from a single 18th century description and illustration, was likely an introduced Cuban macaw.	
Martinique parakeet	Aratinga pertinax ssp.	Martinique	Only known from Mathurin Jacques Brisson's 1760 description and a possible depiction from 1751.	
Ober's parakeet	Aratinga sp.	Dominica	Only known from Frederick Albion Ober's 1879 description.	
Barbados parakeet	Aratinga sp.	Barbados	Only known from Griffith Hughes's 1750 description.	
Guadeloupe parakeet	Psittacara labati	Guadeloupe	Last recorded in 1742. The causes of extinction are unknown.	
Puerto Rican parakeet	Psittacara maugei	Puerto Rico, Vieques, and Mona Island	Last collected on Mona in 1892.	

=== Perching birds (order Passeriformes) ===
==== Chat-tanagers (family Calyptophilidae) ====
===== Possibly extinct =====
Common name	Scientific name	Range	Comments
Gonâve eastern chat-tanager	Calyptophilus frugivorus abbotti	Gonâve Island, Haiti	Last recorded in 1977. Likely extinct due to deforestation.
Samaná eastern chat-tanager	Calyptophilus frugivorus frugivorus	Samaná Peninsula, Dominican Republic	Last recorded in 1982. Likely extinct due to deforestation.

==== Crows and relatives (family Corvidae) ====
Common name	Scientific name	Range	Comments	Pictures
Puerto Rican crow	Corvus pumilis	Puerto Rico and Saint Croix	Known from subfossil remains. Smaller than the white-necked crow.	

===== Locally extinct =====
Common name	Scientific name	Range	Comments	Pictures
White-necked crow	Corvus leucognaphalus	Hispaniola, Puerto Rico, and Saint Croix	Extirpated from Puerto Rico and Saint Croix, survives in Hispaniola.	

==== Swallows (family Hirundinidae) ====
===== Possibly extinct =====
Common name	Scientific name	Range	Comments	Pictures
Jamaican golden swallow	Tachycineta euchrysea euchrysea	Jamaica	Last recorded with certainty in 1989, two years after its last major roosting site was destroyed. Likely declined due to deforestation for agriculture.	

==== New World blackbirds (family Icteridae) ====
Common name	Scientific name	Range	Comments
	Dolichonyx kruegeri	Cuba	Known from now lost Late Quaternary remains. Possibly the same as the bobolink (D. oryzivorus), which flies over Cuba during migration but doesn't reside on it.
Grand Cayman oriole	Icterus leucopteryx bairdi	Grand Cayman, Cayman Islands	Last recorded in 1967.

==== Thrashers, mockingbirds, tremblers, and New World catbirds (family Mimidae) ====
===== Possibly extinct =====
Common name	Scientific name	Range	Comments
Barbados scaly-breasted thrasher	Margarops fuscus atlantica	Barbados	Last recorded in 1990. Declined due to deforestation.

==== New World sparrows (family Passerellidae) ====
Common name	Scientific name	Range	Comments
Bermuda towhee	Pipilio naufragus	Bermuda	Last recorded in 1609–1610.

==== Tapaculos (family Rhinocryptidae) ====
Scientific name	Range	Comments
Scytalopus sp.	Cuba	Known from Late Quaternary remains.

==== Tanagers (family Thraupidae) ====
===== Possibly extinct =====
Common name	Scientific name	Range	Comments	Pictures
St. Kitts bullfinch	Melopyrrha grandis	Saint Kitts	Last collected in 1929. There was an unconfirmed sighting in 1994 and a possible song recorded in 2021. The species could have suffered from hurricanes devastating its mountain forest refugia in 1899, 1924, and 1929, and inability to recover in the lowlands due to deforestation for agriculture, competition with the Lesser Antillean bullfinch, and predation by introduced rats, cats, small Indian mongooses, and green monkeys.	

==== Wrens (family Troglodytidae) ====
Common name	Scientific name	Range	Comments
Guadeloupe house wren	Troglodytes aedon guadeloupensis	Guadeloupe	Last recorded in 1973. Possibly extinct due to deforestation.
Martinique house wren	Troglodytes aedon martinicensis	Martinique	Last collected in 1886. The causes of extinction are unknown.

==== Thrushes (family Turdidae) ====
Common name	Scientific name	Range	Comments
Grand Cayman thrush	Turdus ravidus	Grand Cayman, Cayman Islands	Last recorded in 1938.

==== Tyrant flycatchers (family Tyrannidae) ====
===== Locally extinct =====
Common name	Scientific name	Range	Comments	Pictures
Giant kingbird	Tyrannus cubensis	Cuba, Juventud, and Bahamas	Extirpated from Bahamas, survives in a few localities of Cuba and Juventud.	

==== New World warblers (family Parulidae) ====
===== Possibly extinct =====
Common name	Scientific name	Range	Comments	Pictures
New Providence yellowthroat	Geothlypis rostrata rostrata	New Providence, Bahamas	Last recorded in the 1990s.	
Semper's warbler	Leucopeza semperi	Saint Lucia mountains	Last recorded in 1961. Likely extinct due to predation by the small Indian mongoose.	
Bachman's warbler	Vermivora bachmanii	Southeastern United States and Cuba	Last confirmed record in Cuba in 1984, though unconfirmed footage was taken in Guardalavaca in 2002. Declined due to habitat loss caused by deforestation and marshland draining, followed by intensive hunting by bird collectionists as it became rare.	

== Reptiles (class Reptilia) ==
=== Crocodilians (order Crocodilia) ===
==== Crocodiles (family Crocodylidae) ====
===== Locally extinct =====
Common name	Scientific name	Range	Comments	Pictures
Cuban crocodile	Crocodylus rhombifer	Bahamas, Cuba, Hispaniola, and the Cayman Islands; possibly also Jamaica	Most recent remains in Hispaniola dated to 5480-5370 BCE, the Abaco Islands to 1730-830 BCE, Crooked Island to 1300-1400 CE, and the Caymans to 1030-1585 CE. Historical references to crocodiles on Grand Cayman in 1774 and "alligators" on Great Inagua, Bahamas in 1886 likely refer to this species. Only survives in the Zapata Swamp of western Cuba and the Lanier Swamp of Juventud.	

=== Squamates (order Squamata) ===
==== Whiptails (family Teiidae) ====
Common name	Scientific name	Range	Comments	Pictures
Guadeloupe ameiva	Pholidoscelis cineraceus	Guadeloupe and nearby islands	Last recorded in 1914. Likely extinct due to introduced predators.	

===== Possibly extinct =====
Common name	Scientific name	Range	Comments	Pictures
Martinique giant ameiva	Pholidoscelis major	Petite Terre Islands off Guadeloupe	Last collected before 1825. The causes of extinction are unknown.	

==== Curly-tailed lizards (family Leiocephalidae) ====
Common name	Scientific name	Range	Comments	Pictures
Leeward Islands curlytail	Leiocephalus cuneus	Antigua and Barbuda	Most recent remains dated to around 1500 BCE at Burma Quarry, Antigua.	
Navassa curly-tailed lizard	Leiocephalus eremitus	Navassa Island	Not recorded since its description in 1868. The causes of extinction are unknown.	
Martinique curlytail lizard	Leiocephalus herminieri	Martinique	Last collected in 1837. The causes of extinction are unknown.	

==== Galliwasps (family Diploglossidae) ====
===== Possibly extinct =====
Common name	Scientific name	Range	Comments	Pictures
Jamaica giant galliwasp	Celestus occiduus	Bluefields, Jamaica	Last recorded in 1851. Likely declined due to predation by the introduced small Indian mongoose, and destruction of its woody swamp habitat for logging, agriculture, and residential development.	

==== Iguanas and chuckwallas (family Iguanidae) ====
Common name	Scientific name	Range	Comments
Navassa Island iguana	Cyclura cornuta onchiopsis	Navassa Island	Last recorded in 1878. Probably extinct due to hunting by miners, predation by introduced cats, and competition for vegetation with feral goats.

==== Anoles (family Dactyloidae) ====
===== Possibly extinct =====
Common name	Scientific name	Range	Comments
Virgin Islands giant anole	Anolis roosevelti	Vieques, Culebra, Saint John, and Tortola	Last collected in 1932. The causes of extinction are unknown.

==== Boas (family Boidae) ====
Scientific name	Range	Comments
cf. Boidae	Antigua	Most recent remains dated to around 1500 BCE at Burma Quarry.

==== Colubrid snakes (family Colubridae) ====
===== Possibly extinct =====
Common name	Scientific name	Range	Comments
Saint Croix racer	Borikenophis sanctaecrucis	Saint Croix, U.S. Virgin Islands	Last recorded in the late 19th or early 20th century. Likely extinct due to deforestation and predation by introduced mongooses.

==== Dwarf boas (family Tropidophiidae) ====
===== Possibly extinct =====
Common name	Scientific name	Range	Comments
Navassa Island dwarf boa	Tropidophis bucculentus	Navassa Island	Only known from four specimens collected in the 19th century. The causes of extinction are unknown but may include habitat modification for mining, persecution, and predation by introduced rats and cats.

=== Turtles and tortoises (order Testudines) ===
==== Tortoises (family Testudinidae) ====
Common name	Scientific name	Range	Comments
Abaco tortoise	Chelonoidis alburyorum	Abaco Islands, Bahamas	Most recent remains dated to around 1170 AD.
Cuban giant tortoise	Chelonoidis cubensis	Cuba	Most recent remains dated to 5050-4050 BCE.
Gerson's Hispaniola tortoise	Chelonoidis gersoni	Hispaniola	Known from remains from the late Pleistocene or early Holocene.
Marcano's Hispaniola tortoise	Chelonoidis marcanoi	Hispaniola	Known from remains from the late Pleistocene or early Holocene.
Mona tortoise	Chelonoidis monensis	Mona Island of Puerto Rico	Most recent remains dated to around 1050 BCE.
Caicos giant tortoise	Chelonoidis sp.	Middle Caicos	Most recent remains dated to around 1400 CE.
Turks tortoise	Chelonoidis sp.	Grand Turk Island	Most recent remains dated to around 1200 CE.

== Amphibians (class Amphibia) ==
=== Toads and frogs (order Anura) ===
==== Rain frogs (family Eleutherodactylidae) ====
===== Possibly extinct =====
Common name	Scientific name	Range	Comments	Pictures
Golden coquí	Eleutherodactylus jasperi	Sierra de Cayey, Puerto Rico	Last recorded in 1981. Probably declined due to chytridiomycosis and less likely to predation by introduced black rats.	
Web-footed coquí	Eleutherodactylus karlschmidti	Puerto Rican mountains	Last recorded in 1976. The causes of extinction are unknown, though most specimens collected and preserved in the 1960s were later found to have suffered from chytridiomycosis. Predation by small Indian mongooses and black rats is also possible.	

== Insects (class Insecta) ==
=== Butterflies (order Lepidoptera) ===
==== Swallowtail butterflies (family Papilionidae) ====
Scientific name	Range	Comments	Pictures
Battus polydamas antiquus	Antigua	Only known from a painting made in 1770.	

==== Family Uraniidae ====
Common name	Scientific name	Range	Comments	Pictures
Sloane's Urania butterfly	Urania sloanus	Jamaica lowlands	Last collected in 1908.	

=== Bark lice, book lice, and parasitic lice (order Psocodea) ===
==== Bird body lice (family Menoponidae) ====
Scientific name	Range	Comments
Psittacobrosus bechsteini	Cuba	Parasite of the Cuban macaw, co-extinct with its host.

===== Possibly extinct =====
Scientific name	Range	Comments
Austromenopon confine	Americas	Parasite of the slender-billed curlew.
Saemundssonia jamaicensis	Jamaica, Guadeloupe, and Bahamas	Parasite of the Jamaican petrel.

==== Bird chewing lice (family Philopteridae) ====
===== Possibly extinct =====
Scientific name	Range	Comments
Cummingsiella breviclypeata	Americas	Parasite of the slender-billed curlew.

== Arachnids (class Arachnida) ==
=== Order Mesostigmata ===
==== Family Halarachnidae ====
Common name	Scientific name	Range	Comments	Pictures
Caribbean monk seal nasal mite	Halarachne americana	Caribbean Sea	Extinct with its host.	

=== Order Sarcoptiformes ===
==== Family Pteronyssidae ====
Scientific name	Range	Comments
Pterotrogus principalis	Southern United States and Cuba	Parasite of the ivory-billed woodpecker.

=== Scorpions (order Scorpiones) ===
==== Family Buthidae ====
Scientific name	Range	Comments	Pictures
Tityus exstinctus	Northern range of Martinique	Only known from the holotype collected in 1884. Possibly disappeared due to human activity or the Mount Pelée eruption in 1902.	

== Slugs and snails (class Gastropoda) ==
=== Family Neocyclotidae ===
Scientific name	Range
Amphicyclotulus guadeloupensis	Guadeloupe
Incerticyclus cinereus	Martinique
Incerticyclus martinicensis	Martinique

=== Family Oleacinidae ===
Scientific name	Range
Oleacina guadeloupensis	Guadeloupe

=== Family Pleurodontidae ===
Scientific name	Range	Comments
Pleurodonte desidens	Martinique	Not recorded since its description in 1834.

== Plants (kingdom Plantae) ==
=== Ferns (class Polypodiopsida) ===
==== Ladyferns and allies (family Athyriaceae) ====
===== Extinct in the wild =====
Common name	Scientific name	Range	Comments	Pictures
Governor Laffan's fern	Diplazium laffanianum	Caves between Harrington Sound and Paynter's Vale, Bermuda	Last recorded in the wild in 1905, probably due to destruction by humans and introduced animals. In 2002 spores were sent to the Henry Doorly Zoo in Omaha, Nebraska, where they were propagated and reintroduced to Bermuda in 2014.	

=== Flowering plants (clade Angiospermae) ===
==== Palm trees (family Arecaceae) ====
Scientific name	Range	Comments
Roystonea stellata	Baracoa, Cuba	Only known from the holotype collected in 1939.

==== Staff-vines (family Celastraceae) ====
Common name	Scientific name	Range	Comments
Nazareno	Monteverdia lineata	Western Cuba	Last recorded in 1923.

==== Coca plants (family Erythroxylaceae) ====
===== Extinct in the wild =====
Scientific name	Range
Erythroxylum minutifolium	Cuba

==== Myrtles (family Myrtaceae) ====
Common name	Scientific name	Range	Comments
Mason River myrtle	Myrcia skeldingii	Mason River, central Jamaica	Last recorded in 1972.

==== Coffee trees and relatives (family Rubiaceae) ====
Common name	Scientific name	Range	Comments
Cuero	Guettarda retusa	Pinar del Río, Cuba	Last recorded in 1869. Likely extinct due to deforestation.

==== Rues and citrus trees (family Rutaceae) ====
Common name	Scientific name	Range	Comments
Quina del País	Angostura ossana	Los Palacios, Pinar del Río, Cuba	Last recorded in 1965. Extinct due to overexploitation for its wood and bark.

==== Willows (family Salicaceae) ====
Scientific name	Range	Comments
Banara wilsonii	Puerto Padre, Cuba	Only known from the holotype collected before 1938. The area was later cleared for sugarcane plantation.

===== Possibly extinct =====
Scientific name	Range	Comments
Xylosma serrata	White River Valley, Montserrat	Only known population destroyed by the eruption of the Soufrière Hills volcano in 1997.

== See also ==
- Holocene extinction
- List of North American animals extinct in the Holocene
- List of South American animals extinct in the Holocene
- Peopling of the Americas
- European colonization of the Americas
- Fossil primates of South America and the Caribbean
- Pilosans of the Caribbean
- Rodents of the Caribbean
