= Timeline of extinctions in the Holocene =

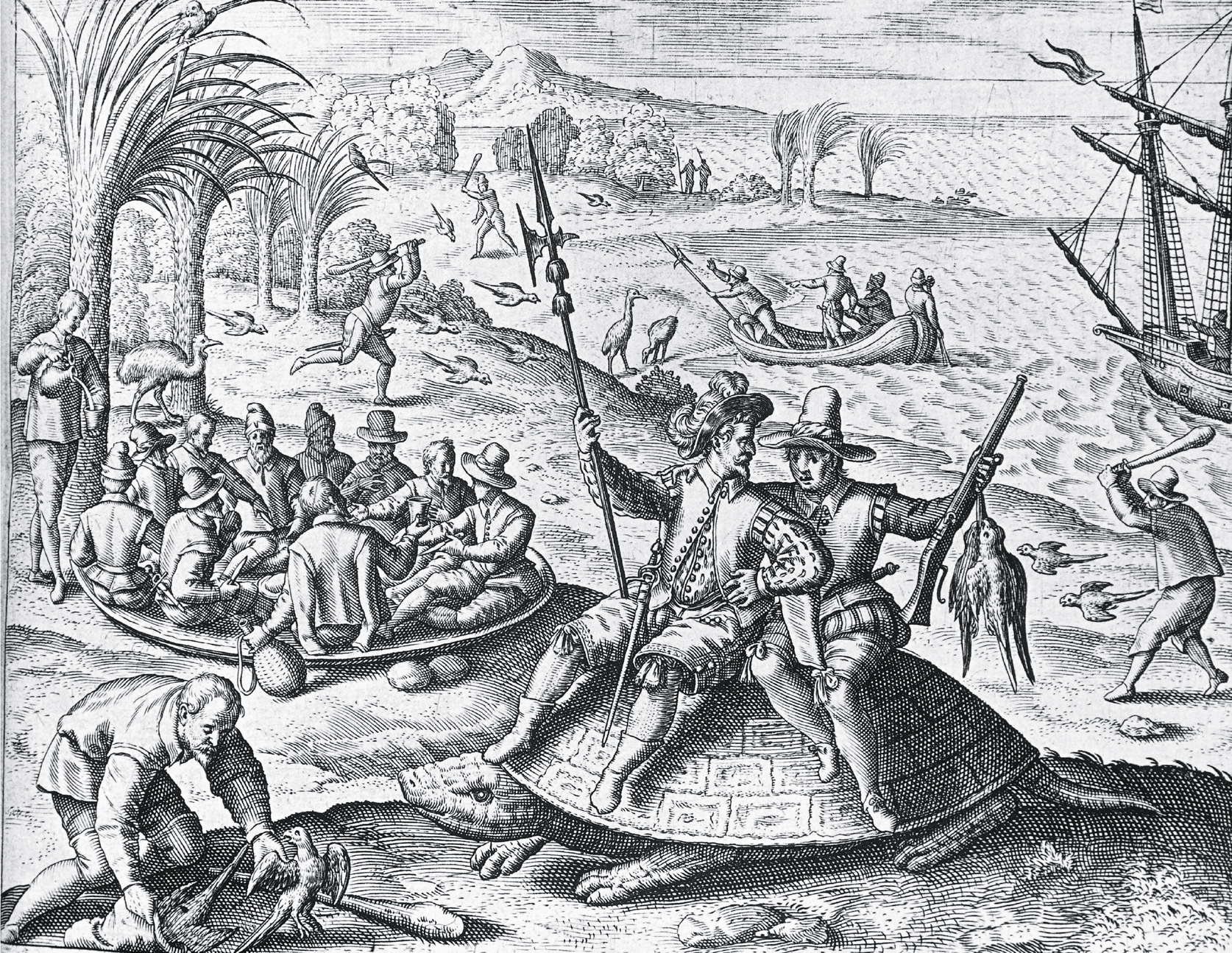
1598 illustration of settlers hunting birds and tortoises in Mauritius.

This article is a list of biological species, subspecies, and evolutionary significant units that are known to have become extinct during the Holocene, the current geologic epoch, ordered by their known or approximate date of disappearance from oldest to most recent.

The Holocene is considered to have started with the Holocene glacial retreat around 11650 years Before Present (c. 9700 BC). It is characterized by a general trend towards global warming, the expansion of anatomically modern humans (Homo sapiens) to all emerged land masses, the appearance of agriculture and animal husbandry, and a reduction in global biodiversity. The latter, dubbed the sixth mass extinction in Earth history, is largely attributed to increased human population and activity, and may have started already during the preceding Pleistocene epoch with the demise of the Pleistocene megafauna.

The following list is incomplete by necessity, since the majority of extinctions are thought to be undocumented, and for many others there isn't a definitive, widely accepted last, or most recent record. According to the species-area theory, the present rate of extinction may be up to 140,000 species per year.

== 10th millennium BC ==
Last record	Common name	Binomial name	Former range	Causes	Picture
9845-9395 BC	American mastodon	Mammut americanum	North America	Undetermined.	
9700–6200 BC	Fraternal horse	Equus fraternus	Eastern North America	Undetermined.	
9700–6200 BC	Long-nosed peccary	Mylohyus fossilis	Eastern United States	Undetermined.	
9600 BC	Cèdres tahr	Hemitragus cedrensis	Eastern Spain to Provence, France	Undetermined.	
9531–9196 BC	Sardinian dhole	Cynotherium sardous	Corsica and Sardinia	Undetermined.	
c. 9515 BC	Southeastern giant tortoise	Hesperotestudo crassiscutata	Southern United States	Undetermined.	
9350 BC	Toronto subway deer	Torontoceros hypogaeus	Toronto, Canada	Undetermined.	
9200–8190 BC		Glossotherium robustum	South America	Undetermined.	
9117–8793 BC	Cuvier's gomphothere	Cuvieronius hyodon	Central America, northern and central Andes	Undetermined.	
9110–9030 BC		Valgipes bucklandi	Brazil	Undetermined.	
9105–8482 BC		Peroryctes aruensis	Pulau Kobroor, Aru Islands, Indonesia	Undetermined.	
c. 9050 BC	Wilson's tortoise	Hesperotestudo wilsoni	Southwestern United States	Climatic changes and human hunting.	
c. 9050 BC	Ryukyu tortoise	Manouria oyamai	Ryukyu, Japan	Undetermined.	
9050 BC	Cypriot genet	Genetta plesictoides	Cyprus	Undetermined.	
9050-8050 BC	Miyako roe deer	Capreolus tokunagai	Miyako Island, Ryukyu, Japan	Undetermined.	
9050-8050 BC	Miyako long-tailed rat	Diplothrix miyakoensis	Miyako Island, Ryukyu, Japan	Undetermined.	
9050-8050 BC		Sus sp.	Miyako Island, Ryukyu, Japan	Undetermined.	

== 9th millennium BC ==
Last record	Common name	Binomial name	Former range	Causes	Picture
8965–8875 BC	Mexican horse	Equus conversidens	Western North America	Hunting.	
8902-8638 BC		Damaliscus hypsodon	Kenya and Tanzania	Undetermined.	
8800-6810 BC		Glyptodon clavipes	Eastern South America	Human hunting.	
8750 BC (Note: Remains and historical references to an unidentified squirrel in Ukraine may extend survival up to the 20th century.)		Spermophilus superciliosus	North Central Europe and the British Isles to Crimea and the Middle Urals		
8718–8300 BC		Aquila nipaloides	Corsica and Sardinia	Undetermined.	
8697–8355 BC		Xibalbaonyx oviceps	Quintana Roo, Mexico	Hunting.	
8450 BC		Microtus brecciensis	Iberian Peninsula	Undetermined.	
8301–7190 BC	Giant pika	Ochotona whartoni	Northern North America; Eastern Siberia?	Undetermined.	
8209–5886 BC		Notiomastodon platensis	South America	Human hunting.	
8120–7980 BC	Giant Cape zebra	Equus capensis	Southern Africa	Reduction of grasslands after the end of the Last Glacial Period. (Note: Ancient DNA studies indicate that the giant Cape zebra is not a separate species, but a distinct lineage of the plains zebra (E. quagga).)	
8050 BC	Ancient bison	Bison antiquus	North America	Possibly hybridisation with western bison resulting in modern American bison.	
8085 BC	Shasta ground sloth	Nothrotheriops shastensis	Southwestern United States	Human hunting.	
8050 BC or less		Hipposideros besaoka	Northern coast of Madagascar	Undetermined.	
8050 BC or less		Triaenops goodmani	Northern coast of Madagascar	Undetermined.	

== 8th millennium BC ==
Last record	Common name	Binomial name	Former range	Causes	Picture
c. 7950 BC		Antifer ultra	River Plate and central Chile	Undetermined.	
7850 BC	Woolly rhinoceros	Coelodonta antiquitatis	Northern Eurasia	Shrinking of the mammoth steppe due to warmer and wetter climate conditions, as well as human hunting.	
7830–7430 BC		Catonyx cuvieri	Eastern South America	Undetermined.	
7610 BC	Giant ground sloth	Megatherium americanum	Temperate South America	Hunting.	
7600–6245 BC (Note: Attributed to Struthio asiaticus in this source, but this name should be limited to remains from Pleistocene India.)	East Asian ostrich	Pachystruthio anderssoni	Tuva, Transbaikalia, Mongolia, and northern China to the Yellow River	Undetermined.	
7433–7035 BC	Mediterranean brown fish owl	Ketupa zeylonensis lamarmorae	Corsica, Sardinia, southern Italy, Crete, and Israel	Possibly prey loss due to human hunting.	
7160–6760 BC		Scelidodon chiliensis	Western South America	Undetermined.	
7129–6239 BC	South American sabertooth cat	Smilodon populator	Eastern South America	Competition with human hunters.	
7080 BC	Dire wolf	Aenocyon dirus	North America and western South America	Undetermined.	
7050 BC		Arctotherium wingei	Eastern South America and Central America	Undetermined.	
7050–6550 BC	European dhole	Cuon alpinus europaeus	Central and southern Europe, and the Caucasus	Undetermined.	
7043–6507 BC	Cuban pauraque	Siphonorhis daiquiri	Cuba	Undetermined.	
7043–6503 BC	Giant ghost-faced bat	Mormoops magna	Cuba and Hispaniola	Undetermined.	
7000–4000 BC	European water buffalo	Bubalus murrensis	Central, eastern, and southeastern Europe	Climatic changes, human hunting, or combination of both.	

== 7th millennium BC ==
Last record	Common name	Binomial name	Former range	Causes	Picture
6940 BC		Equus neogeus	South America	Human hunting.	
6660–4880 BC		Hoplophorus euphractus	Eastern Brazil	Undetermined.	
6660–4880 BC		Propraopus sulcatus	Eastern South America	Undetermined.	
6442–6210 BC	Giant hartebeest	Megalotragus priscus	Southern Africa; Eastern Africa?	Reduction of grasslands after the end of the Last Glacial Period.	
6389–6060 BC		Eutatus seguini	Northern Argentina and Uruguay	Undetermined.	
Before 6350 BC		Cryptoprocta bevatabe	Tsimanampesotse National Park, southwestern Madagascar	Undetermined.	

== 6th millennium BC ==
Last record	Common name	Binomial name	Former range	Causes	Picture
5850 BC		Stenocranius anglicus	Europe	Undetermined.	
5740–5500 BC	Bond's springbok	Antidorcas bondi	Southern Africa	Reduction of grasslands after the end of the Last Glacial Period.	
5660–5540 BC		Scelidotherium leptocephalum	Southern South America	Hunting?	
5641–5075 BC		Praemegaceros cazioti	Corsica and Sardinia	Undetermined.	
5477–4170 BC	Panamerican ground sloth	Eremotherium laurillardi	Southern United States to Brazil	Undetermined.	
5474–5339 BC	Haitian cave rail	Nesotrochis steganinos	Hispaniola	Undetermined.	
5450 BC	Steppe bison	Bison priscus	Northern Eurasia and North America	Climate change and human hunting.	
5295–4848 BC	Ibiza rail	Rallus eivissensis	Ibiza, Spain	Undetermined, but presumably a result of human colonization.	
5295–4848 BC	Ibiza dwarf viper	Vipera latastei ebusitana	Ibiza, Spain	Undetermined, but presumably a result of human colonization.	
5226–5156 BC	Haitian pine forest sloth	Neocnus dousman	Hispaniola	Undetermined.	
5120 BC		Neosclerocalyptus paskoensis	Southern South America	Undetermined.	
5050–4050 BC	Cuban cursorial owl	Ornimegalonyx oteroi	Cuba	Undetermined.	
5050–4050 BC	Cuban titan-hawk	Buteogallus borrasi	Cuba	Undetermined.	
5050–4050 BC	Cuban giant tortoise	Chelonoidis cubensis	Cuba	Undetermined.	
5050–4050 BC	Cuban sloth	Acratocnus antillensis	Cuba	Undetermined.	
5030 BC	Cave hyena	Crocuta (crocuta) spelaea	Europe, Central and Western Asia	Climatic changes, prey loss, and competition with other predators, including humans.	

== 5th millennium BC ==
Last record	Common name	Binomial name	Former range	Causes	Picture
4855–4733 BC	North African horse	Equus algericus	Maghreb	Aridification.	
4850–3350 BC	Giant kangaroo	Protemnodon tumbuna	Northern New Guinea	Hunting and habitat fragmentation.	
4840–4690 BC	Majorcan giant dormouse	Hypnomys morpheus	Mallorca, Spain	Possibly disease spread by introduced rodents.	
4691–4059 BC		Megaceroides algericus	Northern Maghreb	Possibly habitat fragmentation.	
4605 BC	Club-tailed glyptodont	Doedicurus clavicaudatus	South American Pampas	Hunting and habitat loss.	
4570 BC – 130 CE	Jamaican caracara	Caracara tellustris	Jamaica	Undetermined.	
4514–4244 BC		Muridae indet. sp. 1	Morotai, Indonesia	Undetermined.	
4514–4244 BC		Muridae indet. sp. 2	Morotai, Indonesia	Undetermined.	
4360–4280 BCE	Unnamed South African caprine	?Makapania sp.	South African mountains	Reduction of grasslands after the end of the Last Glacial Period.	Restoration of Makapania broomi
4240–1529 BC	Halmahera bandicoot	Peramelidae indet.	Halmahera, Indonesia	Undetermined.	
c. 4000 BC	North African zebra	Equus mauritanicus	North Africa	Aridification.	
c. 4000 BC		Equus melkiensis (Note: Possible synonym of Equus africanus atlanticus.)	Northern Algeria and Morocco	Aridification.	

== 4th millennium BC ==
Last record	Common name	Binomial name	Former range	Causes	Picture
3979–2640 BC	Yukon horse	Equus lambei	Northwestern North America	Undetermined.	
3570–3630 BC	Malagasy crowned eagle	Stephanoaetus mahery	Central and southern Madagascar	Possibly natural aridification or habitat degradation and prey loss caused by human activity.	
3540–3355 BC	Kauaʻi mole duck	Talpanas lippa	Kauaʻi, Hawaii, United States	Undetermined.	
3500–775 BC	Flores cave rat	Spelaeomys florensis	Flores, Indonesia	Undetermined.	
3340–2890 BC		Babakotia radofilai	Northern coast of Madagascar	Undetermined.	
3290–2730 BC	Matthew's ground sloth	Parocnus brownii	Cuba	Hunting.	
3050 BC	Buka Island mosaic-tailed rat	Melomys spechti	Buka Island, Papua New Guinea	Undetermined.	
3050 BC	Buka Island solomys	Solomys spriggsarum	Buka Island, Papua New Guinea	Undetermined.	
3050–550 BC	Don hare	Lepus timidus tanaiticus	Russia	Replacement by the mountain hare.	
3030–2690 BC	Balearic giant shrew	Nesiotites hidalgo	Gymnesian Islands, Spain	Possibly disease spread by introduced rodents.	

== 3rd millennium BC ==
Last record	Common name	Binomial name	Former range	Causes	Picture
2830–2470 BC	Balearic cave goat	Myotragus balearicus	Gymnesian Islands, Spain	Likely vegetation changes related to aridification or human activity.	
2550 BC	Bennu heron	Ardea bennuides	Arabian Peninsula	Wetland degradation.	
2550–1550 BC	Niue night heron	Nycticorax kalavikai	Niue	Undetermined.	
2480–2400 BC	Lesser Haitian ground sloth	Neocnus comes	Hispaniola	Undetermined.	
2320 BC	Irish elk	Megaloceros giganteus	Europe and southern Siberia	Changing environments and human hunting.	
2281–1402 BC		Palaeolama major	North and east South America	Hunting.	
2280–2240 BC	Cuban giant sloth	Megalocnus rodens	Cuba	Undetermined.	
2267–1543 BC		Xenorhinotherium bahiense	Northeastern South America	Undetermined.	
2200 BC	Indian aurochs	Bos primigenius namadicus	Indian subcontinent	Undetermined. (Note: Domestic descendants survive in captivity and as feral populations.)	
2134–1408 BC (Note: Survival to 1350 CE reported by Turvey is not confirmed.)	Chatham raven	Corvus moriorum	Chatham Islands, New Zealand	Undetermined.	
2050 BC	Giant African buffalo	Syncerus antiquus	Africa and the Arabian Peninsula	Aridification, human predation, and competition with domestic cattle for water and pastures.	
2050–50 BC	Sierra Madre giant cloud rat	Carpomys dakal	Luzon, Philippines	Undetermined.	
2050–50 BC	Sierra Madre bushy-tailed cloud rat	Crateromys ballik	Luzon, Philippines	Undetermined.	
2050–50 BC		Niviventer sp.	Ishigaki Island, Japan	Undetermined.	
2035–1735 BC	Hispaniola monkey	Antillothrix bernensis	Hispaniola	Undetermined.	

== 2nd millennium BC ==
Last record	Common name	Binomial name	Former range	Causes	Picture
1935–1700 BC		Raksasamys tikusbesar	Sumba Island, Indonesia	Undetermined.	
1900–1600 BC	Noel's barn owl	Tyto noeli	Cuba, Jamaica, and Bermuda	Undetermined.	
1795–1675 BC	Woolly mammoth	Mammuthus primigenius	Northern Eurasia and North America	Hunting and habitat loss due to climate change.	
1750–1650 BC	Short-horned water buffalo	Bubalus mephistopheles	South to northeastern China	Undetermined.	
1738–1500 BC	Puerto Rican ground sloth	Acratocnus odontrigonus	Puerto Rico	Undetermined.	
1738–1385 BC	Christensen's pademelon	Thylogale christenseni	New Guinea	Predation by introduced dingoes.	
1738–1385 BC		Thylogale sp.	New Guinea		
1666–1506 BC	Ovodov horse	Equus ovodovi	North and East Asia	Undetermined.	
c. 1640 BC	East Asian aurochs	Bos primigenius sinensis	Southern Siberia to northeastern China	Hunting, habitat loss, and capture of females to supplement domestic taurine cattle herds introduced from the west. (Note: Traditionally considered the same as B. p. primigenius on morphological grounds, but revealed to be genetically distinct. Domestic hybrid descendants survive in China, particularly in Tibet, Chamdo, and Yushu. It is likely that many remains from northern China that have been identified as bison or domestic cattle actually belong to aurochs and that it survived for longer than assumed. The anonymous author of the Classic of Poetry (11th–7th century BCE) seems aware of the aurochs's existence.)	
c. 1600 BC		Zonites santoriniensis	Santorini, Greece	Minoan eruption.	
c. 1500 BC	Puerto Rican flower bat	Phyllonycteris major	Puerto Rico and Antigua	Undetermined.	
c. 1500 BC	Leeward Islands curlytail	Leiocephalus cuneus	Antigua and Barbuda	Undetermined.	
1500 BC	Tilos dwarf elephant	Palaeoloxodon tiliensis	Tilos, Greece	Shrinking of insular area due to postglacial marine transgression, volcanic activity, and arrival of humans.	
1400–1190 BC	Greater Azores bullfinch	Pyrrhula crassa	Graciosa Island, Azores, Portugal	Human settlement.	
1159–790 BC	Dune shearwater	Puffinus holeae	Canary Islands, Spain; mainland Portugal (Pleistocene)	Predation by introduced house mice.	
1120–840 BC	New Caledonian giant scrubfowl	Sylviornis neocaledoniae	Grande Terre and Isle of Pines, New Caledonia	Hunting.	
c. 1050 BC	Mona tortoise	Chelonoidis monensis	Mona Island of Puerto Rico	Undetermined.	
1050 BC	Hooijer's giant rat	Hooijeromys nusantenggara	Lesser Sunda Islands, Indonesia	Undetermined.	
1050 BC		Mekosuchus kalpokasi	Efate, Vanuatu	Undetermined.	Hunting.
1050 BC	Verhoeven's giant tree rat	Papagomys theodorverhoeveni	Flores, Indonesia	Undetermined.	
1050–850 BC	Lini's megapode	Mwalau walterlinii	Efate, Vanuatu	Undetermined.	
1021–806 BCE	Madeiran quail	Coturnix lignorum	Madeira, Portugal	Undetermined.	

== 1st millennium BC ==
=== 10th–6th century BC ===
Last record	Common name	Binomial name	Former range	Causes	Picture
c. 1000-500 BC	Giant nukupuʻu	Hemignathus vorpalis	Hawaii Island, Hawaii, United States	Undetermined.	
1000–1 BC	Giant Fiji ground frog	Platymantis megabotoniviti	Viti Levu, Fiji	Predation by introduced Polynesian rats and large New Guinea spiny rats.	
c. 950 BC	Noble scrubfowl	Megavitiornis altirostris	Fiji	Hunting.	
c. 950 BC	Fiji giant iguana	Lapitiguana impensa	Fiji	Hunting.	
c. 950 BC		Volia athollandersoni	Fiji	Hunting.	
950 BC	Erromango starling	Aplonis sp.	Erromango, Vanuatu	Undetermined.	
900–750 BC	Tongan tooth-billed pigeon	Didunculus placopedetes	Tonga	Undetermined.	
855–730 BC	Shutler's fruit pigeon	Ducula shutleri	Tonga	Undetermined.	
855–730 BC	Unnamed Tongan rail	Rallidae incertae sedis	Tonga	Undetermined.	
c. 850 BC	Lakeba pigeon	Ducula lakeba	Lakeba and Aiwa, Fiji	Undetermined.	
850–600 BC	Tongan giant pigeon	Tongoenas burleyi	Tonga	Hunting.	
840–740 BC	Consumed scrubfowl	Megapodius alimentum	Tonga and Fiji	Hunting, egg harvesting, and predation by introduced animals.	
821–171 BC	Balsam shrew	Crocidura balsamifera	Nile gallery forests, Egypt	Habitat destruction.	
c. 810 BC		?Meiolania damelipi	Vanuatu and Viti Levu, Fiji	Hunting.	
800–700 BC	Syrian elephant	Elephas maximus asurus	Mesopotamia	Hunting and habitat loss due to agriculture and aridification. (Note: It was suggested that the Syrian elephant was introduced by humans in Mesopotamia, which would not make it a valid subspecies.)	
790–410 BC	MacPhee's shrew tenrec	Microgale macpheei	Southeastern Madagascar	Aridification.	
787–320 BC	Jamaican ibis	Xenicibis xympithecus	Jamaica	Undetermined.	
770–400 BC	Law's diving-goose	Chendytes lawi	Coastal California and Oregon, United States	Hunting.	
748–406 BC	European wild ass	Equus hydruntinus	Southern Europe and Southwest Asia; Northern Europe (Pleistocene)	Hunting and habitat fragmentation after the end of the Last Glacial Period.	
744-202 BC	Kauaʻi stilt-owl	Grallistrix auceps	Kauaʻi, Hawaii, United States	Undetermined.	
701–119 BC (Note: Survival to c. 1350 CE mentioned by Turvey not confirmed.)	Chatham coot	Fulica chathamensis	Chatham Islands, New Zealand	Probably hunting and predation by introduced mammals.	
550–50 BC	David's imperial pigeon	Ducula david	Ouvéa Island, New Caledonia	Hunting.	
511–407 BC	Plate-toothed giant hutia	Elasmodontomys obliquus	Puerto Rico	Undetermined.	

=== 5th-1st century BC ===
Last record	Common name	Binomial name	Former range	Causes	Picture
450 BC		Mesocapromys kraglievichi	Cuba	Undetermined.	
412–199 BC		Archaeoindris fontoynontii	Central Madagascar	Hunting.	
404 BC	Wild dromedary camel	Camelus dromedarius	Arabian Peninsula	Desertification, hunting, and capture to replenish domestic herds. Domestic and feral descendants survive.	
400–231 BC	Tenerife giant rat	Canariomys bravoi	Tenerife, Canary Islands, Spain	Habitat alteration by introduced goats, sheep, pigs, and house mice.	
c. 350 BC	Tongan giant iguana	Brachylophus gibbonsi	Tonga and Fiji	Hunting.	
348 BC – 283 BC	Sardinian giant shrew	Asoriculus similis (Note: A. corsicanus was originally applied to remains from Corsica and A. similis to Sardinia. It was later recognized that A. corsicanus existed in the early Pleistocene of both islands, and A. similis in the late Pleistocene-Holocene, as seen in Moncunill-Sole et al. (2016).)	Corsica and Sardinia	Introduced black rats and human-induced habitat loss.	
348 BC – 283 BC	Sardinian pika	Prolagus sardus	Corsica and Sardinia	Hunting, predation and competition with introduced mammals. (Note: Claimed survival until 1774 CE in Tavolara Island is based on the mention of 'giant burrow-making rats' by Francesco Cetti.)	
348 BC – 283 BC	Hensel's field mouse	Rhagamys orthodon	Corsica and Sardinia	Introduced black rats and human-induced habitat loss.	
348 BC – 283 BC	Tyrrhenian vole	Tyrrhenicola henseli	Corsica and Sardinia	Introduced black rats and human-induced habitat loss.	
320–220 BC (Note: It is unconfirmed if remains of Equus sp. found in Bolshoy Baranov Cape and dated to 701–900 CE belong to this taxon (Boeskorov, 2006).)	Lena horse	Equus lenensis	Northern Siberia	Hunting.	
c. 240 BC (Note: Historical records mention gibbons being caught near Chang'an until the 10th century, and living in Shaanxi province until the 18th century.)	Imperial gibbon	Nomascus imperialis	Chongqing and possibly Shaanxi, China	Possibly capture as pets and deforestation.	
170 BC - 370 CE	Maui flightless ibis	Apteribis brevis	Maui, Hawaii, United States	Undetermined.	
130 BC	Gran Canaria giant rat	Canariomys tamarani	Gran Canaria, Canary Islands	Hunting or predation by introduced dogs?	
110 BC – 130 BC	Ancient coua	Coua primaeva	Madagascar	Undetermined.	
62 BC – 87 CE	Alor Island giant rat	Alormys aplini	Alor Island, Indonesia	Aridification and deforestation.	
50 BC	Buhler's coryphomys	Coryphomys buehleri	Timor	Undetermined.	
50 BC	Timor giant rat	Coryphomys musseri	Timor	Undetermined.	
49 BC – 125 CE	São Miguel scops owl	Otus frutuosoi	São Miguel Island, Azores, Portugal	Introduced predators?	
after 30 BC	North African aurochs	Bos primigenius africanus	North Africa	Aridification. Domestic descendants survive in captivity.	
10 BC	Greater Cuban nesophontes	Nesophontes major	Cuba	Undetermined.	
10 BC	Lesser falcate-winged bat	Phyllops vetus	Cuba and Juventud	Undetermined.	

== 1st millennium CE ==
=== 1st–5th centuries ===
Last record	Common name	Binomial name	Former range	Causes	Picture
1–1000	Eyles's harrier	Circus teauteensis	New Zealand	Prey loss and habitat alteration.	
1–1000	North Island goose	Cnemiornis gracilis	North Island, New Zealand	Probably hunting.	
54–68	Silphium	Ferula or Thapsia sp.	Cyrenaica coast, Libya	Aridification, overgrazing, and overharvesting.	
54–222		Milimonggamys juliae	Sumba Island, Indonesia	Undetermined.	
80	Halmahera wallaby	Dorcopsis sp.	Halmahera, Indonesia	Predation by introduced dogs.	
86–428	Powerful goshawk	Accipiter efficax	New Caledonia	Undetermined.	
86–428	Gracile goshawk	Accipiter quartus	New Caledonia	Undetermined.	
86–428	Kanaka pigeon	Caloenas canacorum	New Caledonia and Tonga; Vanuatu and Fiji?	Probably hunting.	
86–428	Pile-builder megapode	Megapodius molistructor	New Caledonia and Tonga	Undetermined.	
86–428	New Caledonian ground dove	Pampusana longitarsus	New Caledonia	Undetermined.	
86–428	New Caledonian gallinule	Porphyrio kukwiedei	New Caledonia	Undetermined.	
140–180 (Note: Indirectly dated (Mead et al., 2002).)		Mekosuchus inexpectatus	Grande Terre and Isle of Pines, New Caledonia	Hunting.	
200-300	Fern Weevil	Tymbopiptus valeas	Waitomo, New Zealand	Likely deforestation and predation by introduced Polynesian rats.	
210	Giant fossa	Cryptoprocta spelaea	Madagascar	Undetermined.	
220	Western bison	Bison occidentalis	Alaska and Yukon	Undetermined.	
220–320	Waitomo frog	Leiopelma waitomoensis	North Island, New Zealand	Predation by polynesian rats.	
245-429		Mesopropithecus globiceps	Southwestern Madagascar	Hunting and aridification.	
290–430	Bahaman caracara	Caracara creightoni	Cuba and Bahamas	Undetermined.	
c. 300	Atlas wild ass	Equus africanus atlanticus	North Africa	Undetermined. Domestic descendants survive in captivity.	
300–1200	Marquesas cuckoo-dove	Macropygia heana	Nuku Hiva and Ua Huka, Marquesas Islands	Undetermined.	
347–535	New Ireland forest rat	Rattus sanila	New Ireland, Papua New Guinea	Undetermined.	
before 370	North African elephant	Loxodonta africana pharaoensis	Northwest Africa	Hunting and aridification. (Note: Some experts don't recognize the existence of separate subspecies in Loxodonta africana.)	
428–618		Hypogeomys australis	Central and southern Madagascar	Undetermined.	
439–473	Jamaican monkey	Xenothrix mcgregori	Jamaica	Undetermined.	
440–639	Oʻahu moa-nalo	Thambetochen xanion	Oahu, Hawaii, United States	Undetermined.	
448–657 (Note: Survival until Polynesian arrival c. 1350 not confirmed (Turvey, 2009).)	Chatham duck	Anas chathamica	Chatham Islands, New Zealand	Hunting?	

=== 6th–10th centuries ===
Last record	Common name	Binomial name	Former range	Causes	Picture
530–590	Cuban spectacled owl	Pulsatrix arredondoi	Cuba	Undetermined.	
530–860	Malagasy shelduck	Alopochen sirabensis	Madagascar	Possibly hunting and aridification.	
c. 531		Meiolania mackayi	New Caledonia	Hunting.	
535-876		Hadropithecus stenognathus	Central and southern Madagascar	Hunting and aridification.	
586–670		Voay robustus	Madagascar	Possibly overexploitation of eggs for consumption, environmental changes (natural or caused by human activity), and competition with the Nile crocodile.	
c. 600	Ua Huka rail	Gallirallus gracilitibia	Ua Huka, Marquesas Islands	Human settlement.	
600-765		Mesopropithecus pithecoides	Central Madagascar	Hunting and aridification.	
650		Turnix sp.	Timor, Indonesia	Undetermined.	
650–780		Archaeolemur majori	Madagascar	Hunting and aridification.	
650–869	Small O'ahu crake	Porzana ziegleri	Oahu, Hawaii, United States	Undetermined.	
664–773	Hildebrandt's elephant bird	Aepyornis hildebrandti	Central Madagascar	Deforestation.	
666–857		Geocapromys caymanensis	Cayman Islands	Undetermined.	
666–857	Cayman Islands nesophontes	Nesophontes hemicingulus	Cayman Islands	Undetermined.	
670–836	Lemerle's dwarf hippopotamus	Hippopotamus lemerlei	Southwestern Madagascar	Deforestation, hunting, competition with, and changes to vegetation caused by livestock.	
680–880	Lesser elephant bird	Mullerornis modestus	Central and southern Madagascar	Hunting, aridification, and deforestation.	
668–881		Astrochelys rogerbouri	Central and southern Madagascar	Undetermined.	
687-880	Madagascar dwarf hippopotamus	Hippopotamus madagascariensis	Northwestern and central Madagascar	Deforestation, hunting, competition with, and changes to vegetation caused by livestock.	
700–1150	Huahine starling	Aplonis diluvialis	Huahine, Society Islands, French Polynesia	Undetermined.	
700–1150	Huahine gull	Chroicocephalus utunui	Huahine, Society Islands, French Polynesia	Undetermined.	
700–1150	Huahine rail	Gallirallus storrsolsoni	Huahine, Society Islands, French Polynesia	Possibly hunting and predation by introduced animals.	
700–1150	Huahine cuckoo-dove	Macropygia arevarevauupa	Huahine, Society Islands, French Polynesia	Undetermined.	
700–1150	Huahine swamphen	Porphyrio mcnabi	Huahine, Society Islands, French Polynesia	Possibly hunting and introduced predators.	
772–870	Insular cave rat	Heteropsomys insulans	Puerto Rico	Undetermined.	
810–1025	Sinoto's lorikeet	Vini sinotoi	Marquesas and Society Islands, French Polynesia	Hunting.	
865–965	Malagasy aardvark	Plesiorycteropus madagascariensis	Central and southern Madagascar	Undetermined.	
c. 884	Grandidier's giant tortoise	Aldabrachelys grandidieri	Madagascar	Hunting and aridification.	
890–990	Giant ruffed lemur	Pachylemur insignis	Southwestern Madagascar	Hunting and aridification.	
c. 900–1000		Synemporion keana	Kauai, Oahu, Molokai, and Maui, Hawaii, United States	Hunting and predation by introduced rodents.	
900-1150	Giant aye-aye	Daubentonia robusta	Southern Madagascar	Hunting, expansion of grasses and deforestation caused by domestic cattle and goat grazing.	
c. 950	Giant island deer mouse	Peromyscus nesodytes	Channel Islands of California, United States	Possibly habitat loss through overgrazing and erosion.	
c. 950	Nuku Hiva rail	Gallirallus epulare	Nuku Hiva, Marquesas Islands	Undetermined.	
c. 950	Tahuata rail	Gallirallus roletti	Tahuata, Marquesas Islands	Undetermined.	
950–1350		Ducula tihonireasini	Kamaka, Gambier Islands, French Polynesia	Undetermined.	
980–1170		Megaladapis grandidieri	Madagascar	Hunting and vegetation changes caused by livestock.	
c. 986–1425	Mangaia rail	Gallirallus ripleyi	Mangaia, Cook Islands	Hunting, habitat alteration, and predation by introduced rats, dogs, and pigs.	
c. 986–1425	Mangaia crake	Porzana rua	Mangaia, Cook Islands	Hunting, habitat alteration, and predation by introduced rats, dogs, and pigs.	

== 2nd millennium CE ==
=== 11th–12th century ===
Last record	Common name	Binomial name	Former range	Causes	Pictures
c. 1000	North Island adzebill	Aptornis otidiformis	North Island, New Zealand	Hunting and predation by introduced Polynesian rats.	
1000–1200	Conquered lorikeet	Vini vidivici	Marquesas, Society, and Cook Islands	Possibly predation by Polynesian rats.	
1000–1430	Easter Island heron	cf. Egretta sp.	Easter Island, Chile	Undetermined.	
1000–1430	Easter Island crake	Zapornia sp.	Easter Island, Chile	Undetermined.	
1000–1430	Easter Island parrots	Psittaciformes incertae sedis (two species)	Easter Island, Chile	Undetermined.	
1000–1430	Eastern Island rail	Rallidae incertae sedis	Easter Island, Chile	Undetermined.	
1000–1600	Henderson archaic pigeon	Bountyphaps obsoleta	Henderson Island, Pitcairn	Undetermined.	
1000–1600	Henderson imperial pigeon	Ducula harrisoni	Henderson Island, Pitcairn	Probably hunting and predation by introduced animals.	
1000–1600	Henderson ground dove	Pampusana leonpascoi	Henderson Island, Pitcairn	Undetermined.	
1015–1147	Puerto Rican nesophontes	Nesophontes edithae	Puerto Rico	Undetermined.	
1015–1155	Cape Verde quail	Coturnix centensis	São Vicente, Cape Verde	Undetermined.	
1040–1380 (Note: A commonly cited 1658 account by Étienne de Flacourt could as well be of Mullerornis, or based on second-hand reports of fossil eggs.)	Giant elephant bird	Aepyornis maximus	Southern Madagascar	Hunting, competition with, and changes to vegetation caused by livestock.	
1046–1380	Nēnē-nui	Branta hylobadistes	Oahu, Hawaii, United States	Probably hunting or introduced predators.	
1047–1280		Archaeolemur edwardsi	Central Madagascar	Hunting and changes to vegetation caused by livestock.	
1057–1375	Maui Nui moa-nalo	Thambetochen chauliodous	Molokai and Maui, Hawaii, United States	Undetermined.	
1057–1440	Maui stilt-owl	Grallistrix erdmani	Maui, Hawaii, United States	Undetermined.	
1059–1401	New Zealand swan	Cygnus sumnerensis	New Zealand	Hunting.	
1104–1672	Azorean little gadfly petrel	Pterodroma zinorum	Azores Islands, Portugal	Probably human activity and introduced mammals.	
1170	Bahaman tortoise	Chelonoidis alburyorum	Bahamas	Undetermined.	
1173–1385	Barbuda giant rice rat	Megalomys audreyae	Barbuda	Undetermined.	
1175–1295	Atalaye nesophontes	Nesophontes hypomicrus	Hispaniola	Undetermined.	
1183	New Zealand owlet-nightjar	Aegotheles novaezealandiae	New Zealand	Predation by introduced Polynesian rats.	

=== 13th–14th century ===
Last record	Common name	Binomial name	Former range	Causes	Picture
c. 1200	Ua Huka Booby	Papasula abbotti costelloi	Marquesas Islands, French Polynesia	Hunting and possibly also deforestation.	
1200–1600	Chatham kaka	Nestor chathamensis	Chatham Islands, New Zealand	Probably hunting, deforestation, and predation by introduced Polynesian rats.	
1206–1427		Megaladapis madagascariensis	Madagascar	Hunting.	
1230–1315	Abrupt giant tortoise	Aldabrachelys abrupta	Madagascar	Hunting and aridification.	
1234-1445	South Island adzebill	Aptornis defossor	South Island, New Zealand	Hunting and predation by introduced Polynesian rats.	
1250–1650	Rapa Nui Palm	Paschalococos disperta	Easter Island, Chile	Deforestation and predation of nuts by introduced rats.	
1265–1400	St. Michel nesophontes	Nesophontes paramicrus	Hispaniola	Undetermined.	
1270–1380	Hispaniola woodcock	Scolopax brachycarpa	Hispaniola	Undetermined.	
1270–1395	Lava mouse	Malpaisomys insularis	Lanzarote and Fuerteventura, Canary Islands	Possibly disease spread by introduced rats.	
1270–1475	Lava shearwater	Puffinus olsoni	Lanzarote and Fuerteventura, Canary Islands	Predation by introduced black rats and cats.	
1278–1415	Mantell's moa	Pachyornis geranoides	North Island, New Zealand	Hunting.	
before 1280	Original New Zealand sea lion (Note: Distinct lineage once found all over the North and South Islands, as evidenced by ancient DNA studies on subfossil remains. The subantarctic lineage of the New Zealand sea lion later colonised Stewart Island and the southeastern coast of the South Island from the Auckland and Campbell Islands.)	Phocarctos hookeri 'NZ'	Coastal New Zealand	Hunting.	
1286–1390	North Island giant moa	Dinornis novaezelandiae	North Island, New Zealand	Hunting.	
1292–1630	Chinese gharial	Hanyusuchus sinensis	South China and Hainan	Extermination campaign.	
1294–1438	Heavy-footed moa	Pachyornis elephantopus	Eastern South Island, New Zealand	Hunting.	
1295–1430	Haitian nesophontes	Nesophontes zamicrus	Hispaniola	Undetermined.	
c. 1300	Tubuai rail	Hypotaenidia steadmani	Tubuai, Austral Islands, French Polynesia	Undetermined.	
1300–1500	Malagasy sheldgoose	Centrornis majori	Central Madagascar	Hunting and aridification.	
after 1300	Chatham penguin	Eudyptes warhami	New Zealand	Hunting.	
after 1300	Dwarf yellow-eyed penguin	Megadyptes antipodes richdalei	Chatham Islands, New Zealand	Hunting.	
1300–1400	Malagasy lapwing	Vanellus madagascariensis	Southwestern Madagascar	Aridification.	
1300–1422	Upland moa	Megalapteryx didinus	South Island, New Zealand	Hunting.	
1300–1430		Megaladapis edwardsi	Madagascar	Hunting and vegetation changes caused by livestock.	
1300–1800	Eua rail	Hypotaenidia vekamatolu	Eua, Tonga	Undetermined.	
1310–1410	Western Cuban nesophontes	Nesophontes micrus	Cuba	Undetermined.	
1310–1420	Bush moa	Anomalopteryx didiformis	New Zealand	Hunting.	
1320–1350	Eastern moa	Emeus crassus	South Island, New Zealand	Hunting.	
1320–1350	Haast's eagle	Hieraaetus moorei	South Island, New Zealand	Deforestation and loss of prey. Possibly also predation of nests by introduced pigs and rats.	
1320–1630	Southern sloth lemur	Palaeopropithecus ingens	Southwestern Madagascar	Hunting and vegetation changes caused by livestock.	
1347–1529	Waitaha penguin	Megadyptes antipodes waitaha	Coastal South Island, New Zealand	Hunting.	
1350	Scarlett's shearwater	Puffinus spelaeus	Western South Island, New Zealand	Predation by Polynesian rats.	
1375–1610	Kauaʻi palila	Loxioides kikuchi	Kauaʻi, Hawaii, United States	Human settlement and farming.	
1380–1500	Giant Hawaii goose	Branta rhuax	Hawaiʻi, Hawaii, United States	Probably hunting.	
1390–1470	Great ground dove	Pampusana nui	French Polynesia and Cook Islands	Undetermined.	
1396–1442	Crested moa	Pachyornis australis	Subalpine South Island, New Zealand	Hunting.	

=== 15th–16th century ===
Last record	Common name	Binomial name	Former range	Declared extinct	Causes	Picture
1400–1450	Pico rail	Rallus montivagorum	Pico Island, Açores, Portugal		Undetermined.	
1400–1500	Tenerife giant lizard	Gallotia goliath	Tenerife and La Palma, Canary Islands		Hunting.	
1425–1660	Kauaʻi finch	Telespiza persecutrix	Kauaʻi and Oahu, Hawaii, United States		Undetermined.	
1450–1650	Chatham Islands sea lion	Phocarctos hookeri 'Chathams'	Chatham Islands, New Zealand		Hunting.	
1451–1952 (1558–1728) (Note: "307±85 yr BP (95.4% AD 1451–1952)" (Rawlence & Cooper, 2013))	South Island giant moa	Dinornis robustus	South Island, New Zealand		Hunting.	
1454–1626 (Note: In Tierra del Fuego. Last dated in the continent in 1232–1397 (Prevosti et al., 2015).)		Dusicyon avus	Argentina and Uruguay	2015 (IUCN)	Possibly climate change, hunting, and competition with domestic dogs.	
1460-1660	Dwarf thick-knee	Burhinus nanus	Bahamas		Undetermined.	
1464–1637 (1542–1618) (Note: "370±38yr BP (95.4% AD 1464–1637)" (Rawlence & Cooper, 2013))	Broad-billed moa	Euryapteryx curtus	North, South, and Stewart Island of New Zealand		Hunting.	
c. 1500	Rēkohu shelduck	Tadorna rekohu	Chatham Islands, New Zealand		Human settlement.	
1500-1600	Finsch's duck	Chenonetta finschi	New Zealand	2014 (IUCN)	Hunting and predation by introduced Polynesian rats.	
1500-1600	South Island goose	Cnemiornis calcitrans	South Island, New Zealand		Probably hunting.	
1503	Vespucci's giant rat	Noronhomys vespucii	Fernando de Noronha Island, Brazil	2008 (IUCN)	Undetermined.	
1503-1578	Puerto Rican hutia	Isolobodon portoricensis	Hispaniola and Gonâve; Introduced to Puerto Rico, Mona, and U.S. Virgin Islands	1994 (IUCN)	Possibly predation by introduced black rats.	
1520-1950	Galápagos giant rat	Megaoryzomys curioi	Santa Cruz, Galápagos Islands, Ecuador	2008 (IUCN)	Possibly introduced predators.	
1536-1546	Samaná hutia	Plagiodontia ipnaeum	Hispaniola	2021 (IUCN)	Predation by introduced rodents.	
1550-1670	Hispaniolan edible rat	Brotomys voratus	Hispaniola	1994 (IUCN)	Introduced rats.	
1555	Ascension night heron	Nycticorax olsoni	Ascension Island		Probably predation by introduced cats and rats.	
1585	Cayman Islands hutia	Capromys pilorides lewisi	Grand Cayman, Cayman Brac, and Little Cayman, Cayman Islands		Possibly hunting, introduced predators, and habitat loss caused by introduced ungulates.	

=== 17th century ===
Last record	Common name	Binomial name	Former range	Declared extinct	Causes	Picture
1600–1700	Hodgens's waterhen	Tribonyx hodgenorum	New Zealand	2014 (IUCN)	Hunting and predation by Polynesian rats.	
1601	Stout-legged duck	cf. Anas bernieri	Rodrigues		Undetermined.	
1602	Mauritius white-throated rail	Dryolimnas chekei	Mauritius	1638	Hunting and predation by introduced mammals.	
1603	Bermuda hawk	Bermuteo avivorus	Bermuda	2014 (IUCN)	Possibly hunting and predation by introduced feral pigs and other animals.	
1609-1610	Bermuda saw-whet owl	Aegolius gradyi	Bermuda	1623; 2014 (IUCN)	Habitat destruction and introduced predators.	
1609-1610	Bermuda towhee	Pipilio naufragus	Bermuda		Undetermined.	
1610	Bermuda night heron	Nyctanassa carcinocatactes	Bermuda	2014 (IUCN)	Possibly hunting and introduced predators.	
1623	Bermuda flicker	Colaptes oceanicus	Bermuda	2014 (IUCN)	Probably predation by introduced cats.	
1627 (Note: In Poland. Unconfirmed remains and sightings might extend survival in Bulgaria and Russia until the 18th century.)	Eurasian aurochs	Bos primigenius primigenius	Mid-latitude Eurasia	2008 (IUCN)	Hunting, competition with, and diseases from domestic cattle. Domestic descendants survive worldwide, including feral populations.	
c. 1640	Saint Helena rail	Aphanocrex podarces	Saint Helena	1988 (IUCN)	Probably hunting and predation by introduced cats, rats, and other mammals.	
c. 1640	Olson's petrel	Bulweria bifax	Saint Helena	1988 (IUCN)	Hunting and introduced predators?	
c. 1640	Saint Helena cuckoo	Nannococcyx psix	Saint Helena	1988 (IUCN)	Possibly deforestation.	
c. 1640	Saint Helena petrel	Pterodroma rupinarum	Saint Helena	1988 (IUCN)	Probably deforestation and introduced mammals.	
c. 1640	Saint Helena hoopoe	Upupa antaios	Saint Helena	1988 (IUCN)	Possibly hunting and introduced predators.	
c. 1640	Saint Helena crake	Zapornia astrictocarpus	Saint Helena	1988 (IUCN)	Probably introduced predators.	
Before 1650	Chatham Islands swan	Cygnus sumnerensis chathamicus	Chatham Islands, New Zealand		Hunting.	
c. 1650	Markham's frog	Leiopelma markhami	South Island, New Zealand		Predation by polynesian rats.	
1656	Ascension crake	Mundia elpenor	Ascension Island	1988 (IUCN)	Possibly introduction of rats and cats, although it is not attested by the time they arrived in the 18th and 19th centuries.	
1670-1950 (Note: A 1976 sighting is unconfirmed (Burney et al., 2004).)	Larger Malagasy hippopotamus	Hippopotamus laloumena	Eastern Madagascar		Increased human and cattle pressure after the introduction of prickly pear farming. Its specific separation from the common hippopotamus has been questioned.	
1671–1672	Réunion blue pigeon	Alectroenas sp.	Réunion	1704	Probably hunting and predation by introduced cats.	
1671–1672	Réunion sheldgoose	Alopochen kervazoi	Réunion	1710; 1988 (IUCN)	Hunting and habitat destruction.	
1671–1672	Réunion kestrel	Falco duboisi	Réunion	2004 (IUCN)	Undetermined.	
1671–1672	Réunion fody	Foudia delloni	Réunion	2016 (IUCN)	Possibly deforestation or predation by introduced rats.	
1671–1672	Réunion parrot	?Necropsittacus borbonicus	Réunion		Undetermined.	
1673–1675	Broad-billed parrot	Lophopsittacus mauritianus	Mauritius	1693; 1988 (IUCN)	Hunting.	
1674	Réunion rail	Dryolimnas augusti	Réunion	2014 (IUCN)	Probably hunting and introduced rats and cats.	
1674	Réunion night heron	Nycticorax duboisi	Réunion	1988 (IUCN)	Hunting.	
1675-1755	Giant vampire bat	Desmodus draculae	Eastern South America; Central America (Pleistocene)		Undetermined.	
1688	Dodo	Raphus cucullatus	Mauritius	1988 (IUCN)	Hunting.	
before 1690	Rodrigues blue pigeon	Alectroenas payandeei	Rodrigues		Undetermined.	
1693	Mauritius sheldgoose	Alopochen mauritiana	Mauritius	1698; 1988 (IUCN)	Hunting.	
1693	Red rail	Aphanapteryx bonasia	Mauritius	1988 (IUCN)	Hunting and predation by introduced cats.	
1693	Mascarene coot	Fulica newtonii	Mauritius and Réunion	1988 (IUCN)	Hunting.	
1693	Mauritius night heron	Nycticorax mauritianus	Mauritius	1988 (IUCN)	Probably hunting.	
1696	Amsterdam wigeon	Mareca marecula	Amsterdam Island, French Southern and Antarctic Lands	1874; 1988 (IUCN)	Hunting and predation by introduced rats.	

=== 18th century ===
Last record	Common name	Binomial name	Former range	Declared extinct	Causes	Picture
1700–1800	Réunion scops owl	Otus grucheti	Réunion		Deforestation.	
1704	Réunion pigeon	Nesoenas duboisi	Réunion	1988 (IUCN)	Predation by introduced black rats and cats.	
1705	Mascarene reed cormorant	Phalacrocorax africanus nanus	Mauritius and Réunion		Probably hunting and predation by introduced cats.	
1710	Mascarene teal (Note: In Réunion. Last recorded on Mauritius in 1700.)	Anas theodori	Mauritius and Réunion		Hunting and possibly predation by introduced cats.	
1710	Réunion pochard	cf. Aythya innotata	Réunion		Undetermined.	
1724	Guadeloupe parakeet	Psittacara labati	Guadeloupe	1988 (IUCN)	Probably hunting.	
1725-1726	Rodrigues petrel	Pterodroma sp.	Rodrigues		Predation by introduced cats and rats.	
1726	Rodrigues rail	Erythromachus leguati	Rodrigues	1988 (IUCN)	Hunting.	
1726	Rodrigues owl	Otus murivorus	Rodrigues	1988 (IUCN)	Probably hunting, deforestation, and predation by introduced animals.	
1726	Rodrigues starling	Necropsar rodericanus	Rodrigues	1761; 1988 (IUCN)	Undetermined.	
1726	Rodrigues pigeon	Nesoenas rodericanus	Rodrigues	1761; 1988 (IUCN)	Probably predation by introduced black rats.	
1726	Rodrigues night heron	Nycticorax megacephalus	Rodrigues	1761; 1988 (IUCN)	Hunting.	
c. 1730	Mauritius wood pigeon	Columba thiriouxi	Mauritius	2014 (IUCN)	Hunting, predation by introduced black rats, and deforestation.	
c. 1730	Mauritius turtle dove	Nesoenas cicur	Mauritius	2014 (IUCN)	Hunting, predation by introduced mammals, and deforestation.	
c. 1730	Réunion swamphen	Porphyrio caerulescens	Réunion	1988 (IUCN)	Hunting.	
1732	Réunion parakeet	Psittacula eques eques	Réunion	1732	Hunting and deforestation.	
c. 1735-1844 (Note: Extinct in the main island by 1735, but living tortoises of unknown species were found in Île Ronde, Mauritius in 1844 (Cheke & Hume, 2009).)	Saddle-backed Mauritius giant tortoise	Cylindraspis inepta	Mauritius	1994 (IUCN)	Possibly hunting and introduced predators and competitors.	
c. 1735-1844	Domed Mauritius giant tortoise	Cylindraspis triserrata	Mauritius	1994 (IUCN)	Possibly hunting and introduced predators and competitors.	
1741-1768		Cyamus rhytinae	Bering Sea; Northern Pacific coasts from Japan to Baja California (Pleistocene)		Extinction of its host, the Steller's sea cow.	
1741-1768	Steller's sea cow	Hydrodamalis gigas	Bering Sea; Northern Pacific coasts from Japan to Baja California (Pleistocene)	1768; 1986 (IUCN)	Hunting and reduction of kelp as a result of sea otter hunting, which caused proliferation of kelp-eating sea urchins.	
1742 (Note: A 1779 painting by Louis-Jean-Marie Daubenton could depict this species in captivity (Hume, 2017).)	Lesser Antillean macaw	Ara guadeloupensis	Guadeloupe		Undetermined.	
1746		Corynanthe brachythyrsus	Cameroon	1998 (IUCN)	Undetermined.	
1759	Mauritius grey parrot	Lophopsittacus bensoni	Mauritius and Réunion	1988 (IUCN)	Hunting.	
1761	Rodrigues parrot	Necropsittacus rodricanus	Rodrigues	1988 (IUCN)	Hunting.	
1761	Rodrigues solitaire	Pezophaps solitaria	Rodrigues	1778; 1988 (IUCN)	Hunting and predation by introduced cats.	
1762-1790	Carpathian wisent (Note: Dubious subspecies, based on a single neurocranium that was destroyed in the Hungarian Revolution of 1956.)	Bison bonasus hungarorum	Carpathian Mountains, Eastern Europe			
1763	Réunion ibis	Threskiornis solitarius	Réunion	1988 (IUCN)	Hunting.	
1768-1779	Society Islands ground dove	Pampusana erythroptera ssps.	Moorea and Tahiti, French Polynesia		Undetermined.	
1770	Ancient Polydamas swallowtail	Battus polydamas antiquus	Antigua	2018	Undetermined.	
1771	Saint Helena ebony (Note: Unconfirmed reports in 1816 (IUCN).)	Trochetiopsis melanoxylon	Saint Helena lowlands	1998 (IUCN)	Logging and predation by introduced goats.	
1773–1774	Raiatea parakeet	Cyanoramphus ulietanus	Raiatea, Society Islands, French Polynesia	1988 (IUCN)	Possibly deforestation, hunting, and predation by introduced species.	
1774	Tanna ground dove	Alopecoenas ferrugineus	Tanna, Vanuatu	1988 (IUCN)	Hunting?	
1774	Raiatea starling	?Aplonis ulietensis	Raiatea, Society Islands, French Polynesia	1850; 2016 (IUCN)	Possibly predation by introduced rats.	
1775	Seychelles purple swamphen	Porphyrio sp.	Mahé, Seychelles		Hunting, deforestation, and predation by introduced mammals.	
1777	Tongatapu rail	Hypotaenidia hypoleucus	Tongatapu, Tonga		Predation by introduced dogs.	
1777	Moorea sandpiper	Prosobonia ellisi	Moorea, Society Islands, French Polynesia	1988 (IUCN)	Predation by introduced rats.	
1777	Tahiti sandpiper	Prosobonia leucoptera	Tahiti, Society Islands, French Polynesia	1988 (IUCN)	Predation by introduced rats.	
1778	Christmas sandpiper	Prosobonia cancellata	Kiritimati, Kiribati	2014 (IUCN)	Probably predation by introduced cats.	
1779	Martinique amazon	Amazona martinicana	Martinique	1988 (IUCN)	Probably hunting.	
1779	Guadeloupe amazon	Amazona violacea	Guadeloupe	1988 (IUCN)	Hunting.	
1784	Tahiti crake	Zapornia nigra	Tahiti, Society Islands, French Polynesia	1988 (IUCN)	Possibly introduced predators.	
1788	Norfolk Island rail	Hypotaenidia sp.	Norfolk Island, Australia		Hunting.	
1788	Norfolk swamphen	Porphyrio sp.	Norfolk Island, Australia		Hunting.	
1788–1790	Norfolk ground dove	Pampusana norfolkensis	Norfolk and possibly Nepean Island, Australia		Undetermined.	
1788–1790	Mount Pitt petrel	Pterodroma sp.	Norfolk Island, Australia		Hunting.	
1790	White swamphen	Porphyrio albus	Lord Howe Island, Australia	1834; 1988 (IUCN)	Hunting.	
1793	Oceanic eclectus parrot	Eclectus infectus	Tonga and Vanuatu; Fiji?	2014 (IUCN)	Probably hunting and predation by introduced mammals.	
1793	Vava'u rail	Hypotaenidia vavauensis	Vava'u, Tonga		Possibly habitat destruction and introduced predators.	
1799–1800	Bluebuck	Hippotragus leucophaeus	Overberg; South Africa (Pleistocene)	1986 (IUCN)	Vegetation change and disruption of migration routes after the Last Glacial Period, competition with domestic cattle, overhunting, and further habitat loss due to agriculture.	

== 3rd millennium CE ==
=== 21st century ===
Last record	Common name	Binomial name	Former range	Declared extinct	Causes	Picture
2000	Liliwai	Acaena exigua	Maui and Kauai, Hawaii, United States	2003 (IUCN)	Undetermined.	
2000	Pyrenean ibex (Note: A clone of the last individual was successfully produced in 2003, but died several minutes after birth due to a lung defect.)	Capra pyrenaica pyrenaica	Pyrenees; Cantabrian Mountains?	2000 (IUCN)	Hunting, competition for pastures and diseases from exotic and domestic ungulates.	
2000	Beaver pond marstonia	Marstonia castor	Lake Blackshear, Georgia, United States	2017	Pollution and urban development.	
2000	Skottsberg's false ohelo	Wikstroemia skottsbergiana	Kauai, Hawaii, United States		Habitat degradation, introduced predators including pigs, goats, and rats, and also competition with introduced plants like Cyathea cooperi, Melastoma candidum, Clidemia hirta, Axonopus fissifolius, Cyperus meyenianus, Juncus planifolius, Oplismenus hirtellus, Rubus rosifolius, Sacciolepis indica, Schizachyrium condensatum, Setaria gracilis, and Psidium guajava.	
2000	White-chested white-eye (Note: Unconfirmed sighting in 2005 (Hume).)	Zosterops albogularis	Norfolk Island, Australia	2024 (IUCN)	Deforestation, competition with the silvereye (introduced in 1904), and predation by rats (introduced in the 1940s).	
2001	Glaucous macaw	Anodorhynchus glaucus	Border area of Argentina, Paraguay, Brazil, and Uruguay		Deforestation for agriculture and livestock grazing, particularly of the Yatay palm in which it fed. Possibly also hunting and capture for the exotic pet trade.	
2001	Slender-billed curlew	Numenius tenuirostris	Western Eurasia and northern Africa	2024 (IUCN)	Hunting and habitat destruction.	
2001	Pernambuco pygmy owl	Glaucidium mooreorum	Pernambuco, Brazil		Habitat destruction.	
2001	Giant Atlas barbel	Labeobarbus reinii	Oued Ksob and Tensift Rivers, Morocco	2022 (IUCN)	Undetermined.	
2001		Phyllostegia knudsenii	Waimea, Kauai, Hawaii, United States		Predation by introduced animals (rats, slugs, goats, pigs) and competition with introduced plants (Rubus argutus, Kalanchoe pinnata, Psidium cattleianum, Grevillea robusta, Myrica faya, Mariscus meyenianus, Passiflora mollissima, Lantana camara, Setaria parviflora and Erigeron karvinskianum).	
2001		Plectostoma sciaphilum	Bukit Panching, Pahang, Peninsular Malaysia	2014 (IUCN)	Habitat destruction caused by limestone quarrying.	
2002	Chinese river dolphin (Note: In captivity. Unconfirmed wild sighting in 2018. https://www.theworldofchinese.com/2019/02/the-search-for-the-river-goddess/)	Lipotes vexillifer	Middle and lower Yangtze, China	2007	Fishing, habitat destruction, and vessel strikes.	
2002	Polynesian tree snail	Partula labrusca	Raiatea, Society Islands, French Polynesia	2007 (IUCN)	Predation by introduced rosy wolfsnails.	
2003	Osgood's Ethiopian toad	Altiphrynoides osgoodi	South-central Ethiopian mountains		Habitat degradation.	
2003	Saint Helena olive (Note: In captivity. Last wild individual died in 1994 (IUCN).)	Nesiota elliptica	Saint Helena	2004 (IUCN)	Deforestation for fuel and timber, and use of the land for plantations of New Zealand flax, leading to inbreeding depression and fungal infections from reduced numbers.	
2003	Chinese paddlefish	Psephurus gladius	Yangtze and Yellow River basins, China	2018 (IUCN)	Overfishing and construction of the Gezhouba Dam blocking the anadromous spawning migration	
2004	Po'ouli	Melamprosops phaeosoma	Eastern Maui, Hawaii, United States	2017 (IUCN)	Introduced avian malaria and predators.	
2004	Cozumel thrasher	Toxostoma guttatum	Cozumel, Yucatán Peninsula, Mexico		Hurricanes Roxanne, Emily, and Wilma.	
2005	Cahaba pebblesnail	Clappia cahabensis	Cahaba River, Alabama, United States	2021 (IUCN)	Water pollution.	
2005		Dypsis brittiana	Tsaramain’Andro, Makira Natural Park, Madagascar		Human exploitation.	
2005	Aphrodite's tree snail	Partula cytherea	Papenoo valley, Tahiti, French Polynesia		Predation by introduced rosy wolfsnails.	
before 2006	Western black rhinoceros	Diceros bicornis longipes	South Sudan to Nigerian-Niger border area	2011 (IUCN)	Hunting.	
2006		Artemisia kauaiensis	Kauai, Hawaii, United States		Predation by introduced mule deer and feral pigs, and competition with invasive plants including Lantana camara, Juncus planifolius, Axonopus fissifolius, Rubus rosifolius, and Andropogon virginicus.	
2007		Barbodes sirang	Lake Lanao, Philippines		Predation by introduced fish, overfishing, water extraction, and pollution.	
2007	South Island kōkako (Note: An unconfirmed sighting and recorded call took place in 2021.)	Callaeas cinereus	South Island, New Zealand		Habitat destruction from logging and grazing ungulates, and predation by introduced black rats, brush-tailed possums, and stoats.	
2007	Cryptic Treehunter	Cichlocolaptes mazarbarnetti	Northeastern Brazil	2019 (IUCN)	Extensive habitat loss due to logging and sugar cane production.	
2007	La Palma giant lizard (Note: Possible sightings. Otherwise known from subfossil remains (IUCN).)	Gallotia auaritae	La Palma, Canary Islands, Spain		Undetermined.	
2007	Mendelson's water frog	Telmatobius mendelsoni	Cusco and Ayacucho, Peru		Chytridiomycosis.	
2008	Lindog	Barbodes lindog	Lake Lanao, Mindanao, Philippines		Predation by introduced fish, overfishing, water extraction, and pollution.	
2008	Ussuri dhole	Cuon alpinus alpinus	Western Sayan Mountains to Sikhote-Alin and North Korea		Undetermined.	
2008	Catanduanes bleeding-heart	Gallicolumba luzonica rubiventris	Catanduanes, Philippines		Undetermined.	
2008	Barada spring minnow	Pseudophoxinus syriacus	Barada stream, Lebanon and Syria		Pollution and draining of the river due to water substraction.	
2009	Bramble Cay melomys	Melomys rubicola	Bramble Cay, Australia	2015 (IUCN)	Sea level rise as a consequence of global warming.	
2009	Christmas Island pipistrelle	Pipistrellus murrayi	Christmas Island, Australia	2017 (IUCN)	Undetermined.	
2010	Vietnamese rhinoceros	Rhinoceros sondaicus annamiticus	South China and Indochina	2011 (IUCN)	Hunting.	
2010	Lake Oku puddle frog	Phrynobatrachus njiomock	Kilum-Ijim forest, Mount Oku, Cameroon		Possibly chytridiomycosis.	
2011	Alagoas foliage-gleaner	Philydor novaesi	Alagoas and Pernambuco, Brazil	2019 (IUCN)	Deforestation.	
2012	Pinta Island tortoise (Note: In captivity. Last individual captured from the wild in 1972 (IUCN).)	Chelonoidis abingdonii	Pinta, Galápagos Islands, Ecuador	2012 (IUCN)	Hunting and overgrazing by introduced goats. Hybrid descendants exist in other Galapagos islands, as a result of human intervention.	
2012	Parras pupfish	Cyprinodon latifasciatus	Laguna de Mayrán basin, Coahuila, Mexico		Undetermined.	
2014	Christmas Island forest skink (Note: In captivity. Last seen in the wild in 2010 (IUCN).)	Emoia nativitatis	Christmas Island, Australia	2017 (IUCN)	Habitat loss to mining and predation by introduced Indian wolf snake and yellow crazy ant.	
2014	Catarina pupfish (Note: In captivity. Last recorded in the wild before 1994 (González et al.).)	Megupsilon aporus	El Potosí spring, Galeana, Nuevo León, Mexico	2018 (IUCN)	Predation by introduced Florida bass and habitat loss from water extraction. The captive population was wiped out by mycobacteriosis.	
2015-2018		Mollinedia myriantha	Macaé de Cima Environmental Protection Area, Nova Friburgo, Rio de Janeiro, Brazil		Habitat fragmentation and degradation caused by construction and other human activity.	
2016	Captain Cook's bean snail	Partula faba	Raiatea and Tahaʻa, Society Islands, French Polynesia	2016	Predation by introduced rosy wolfsnails.	
2016	Rabbs' fringe-limbed treefrog (Note: In captivity. Call last heard in the wild in 2008 (IUCN).)	Ecnomiohyla rabborum	El Valle de Antón, Panama	2016	Chytridiomycosis.	
2019 (Note: In captivity. Last captured in the wild in 1997 (Bowler, 2019).)	Oahu tree snail	Achatinella apexfulva	Oahu, Hawaii, United States	2019	Predation by introduced rosy wolfsnails.	

== See also ==
- List of extinct animals
- Extinction event
- Quaternary extinction event
- Holocene extinction
- Timeline of the evolutionary history of life
- Timeline of environmental history
- Index of environmental articles
- List of environmental issues
- Evolutionary anachronism
- Rewilding
- Deextinction
- Breeding back
