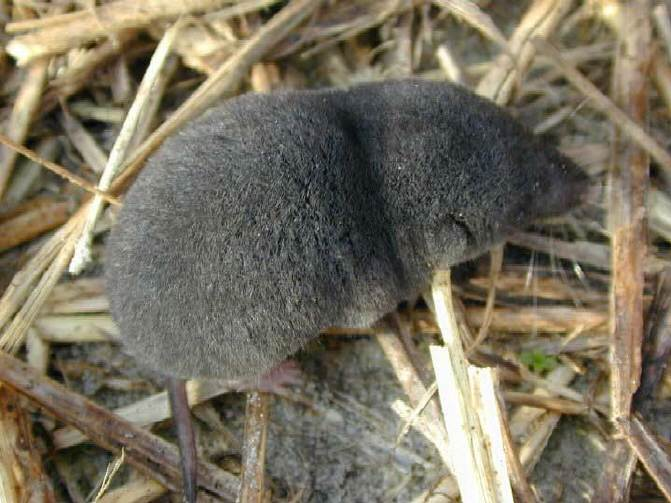
- Southern short-tailed shrew

Scientific classification
- Kingdom: Animalia
- Phylum: Chordata
- Class: Mammalia
- Order: Lipotyphla
- Suborder: Soricomorpha; Gregory 1910

Families
- †Heterosoricidae; †Nesophontidae; †Nyctitheriidae; Solenodontidae; Soricidae; Talpidae

= Soricomorpha =

Soricomorpha Temporal range: Early Paleocene–Recent

Formerly used suborder of mammals

Soricomorpha (from Greek "shrew-form") is a formerly used taxon within the class of mammals. In the past it formed a significant group within the former order Insectivora. However, Insectivora was shown to be polyphyletic and various new orders were split off from it, including Afrosoricida (tenrecs, golden moles, otter shrews), Macroscelidea (elephant shrews), and Erinaceomorpha (hedgehogs and gymnures), with the four remaining extant and recent families of Soricomorpha shown here then being treated as a separate order. Insectivora was left empty and disbanded.

Subsequently, Soricomorpha itself was shown to be paraphyletic, because Soricidae shared a more recent common ancestor with Erinaceidae than with other soricomorphs. The combination of Soricomorpha and Erinaceidae, referred to as order Eulipotyphla, has been shown to be monophyletic.

Living members of the group range in size from the Etruscan shrew, at about 3.5 cm (1.4 in) and 2 grams (0.07 oz), to the Cuban solenodon, at about 32 cm (13 in) and 1 kg (2.2 lb).

- Soricomorpha
  - Family Soricidae (shrews)
    - Subfamily Crocidurinae: (white-toothed shrews)
    - Subfamily Soricinae: (red-toothed shrews)
    - Subfamily Myosoricinae: (African white-toothed shrews)
  - Family Talpidae: (moles and close relatives)
    - Subfamily Scalopinae (New World moles and close relatives)
    - Subfamily Talpinae (Old World moles and close relatives)
    - Subfamily Uropsilinae (Chinese shrew-like moles)
  - Family Solenodontidae: solenodons (rare primitive eulipotyphlans of the Caribbean; two extant species)
  - Family † Nesophontidae: West Indian shrews (recently extinct eulipotyphlans of the Caribbean)
  - Family † Heterosoricidae
    - genus †Atasorex
    - genus †Dinosorex
    - genus †Domnina
    - genus †Gobisorex
    - genus †Heterosorex
    - genus †Ingentisorex
    - genus †Lusorex
    - genus †Paradomnina
    - genus †Quercysorex
  - Family † Nyctitheriidae
