= Shrew (disambiguation) =

Shrew may refer to:

== Animals ==
- Shrew (family Soricidae)
- Treeshrew (order Scandentia), native to Southeast Asia
- Elephant shrew (family Macroscelididae), native to Africa
- Otter shrew (subfamily Potamogalinae), native to Africa
- West Indies shrew (genus Nesophontes), native to Caribbean islands (Extinct)

== Literature ==
- Shrew (stock character), a difficult woman
- The Taming of the Shrew by William Shakespeare, in which the word refers to a difficult woman.

== Other uses ==
- The Shrews, fictional characters in the animated series The Animals of Farthing Wood
- Shrew, a name originally proposed for the British fighter airplane Supermarine Spitfire
- The Killer Shrews, a 1959 science fiction film directed by Ray Kellogg and also featured on an episode of Mystery Science Theater 3000.
- "The Shrew", a song by Beirut from their 2009 album March of the Zapotec
