= Culebra Island amazon =

Conservation status
- Extinct

Scientific classification
- Kingdom: Animalia
- Phylum: Chordata
- Class: Aves
- Order: Psittaciformes
- Family: Psittacidae
- Genus: Amazona
- Species: A. vittata
- Subspecies: A. v. gracilipes

Trinomial name
- Amazona vittata gracilipes Ridgway, 1915

Extinct subspecies of parrot

The Culebra Island amazon (Amazona vittata gracilipes), also known as the Culebran parrot or the Culebran red-fronted amazon, is an extinct subspecies of the Puerto Rican amazon that was native to Culebra Island, Puerto Rico. The last record of the subspecies was in 1912, which is generally recorded as its extinction date, although scattered individuals may have survived longer on the island. It was first described by Robert Ridgway in 1915, three years after the subspecies' approximate extinction.
