= Ciconia lydekkeri =

Ciconia lydekkeri Temporal range: Middle to Late Pleistocene

Scientific classification
- Kingdom: Animalia
- Phylum: Chordata
- Class: Aves
- Order: Ciconiiformes
- Family: Ciconiidae
- Genus: Ciconia
- Species: †C. lydekkeri

Binomial name
- †Ciconia lydekkeri (Ameghino, 1891)

Synonyms
- Prociconia lydekkeri Ameghino, 1891; Jabiru lydekkeri (Ameghino, 1891); ?Ciconia maltha Miller, 1910

Extinct species of bird

Ciconia lydekkeri is an extinct species of stork from the Middle and Late Pleistocene of Brazil, Bolivia and Argentina.

Florentino Ameghino named the species after British paleontologist Richard Lydekker, whom first described bones discovered in caves near Lagoa Santa, Minas Gerais, Brazil.

Ciconia maltha has been considered to be a synonym of this species and, if accepted, would increase its range to include United States and Cuba.
