= Bahaman caracara =

Bahaman caracara Temporal range: Quaternary

Conservation status
- Extinct

Scientific classification
- Kingdom: Animalia
- Phylum: Chordata
- Class: Aves
- Order: Falconiformes
- Family: Falconidae
- Genus: Caracara
- Species: †C. creightoni

Binomial name
- †Caracara creightoni Brodkorb, 1959

Synonyms
- Polyborus creightoni

Extinct species of bird

The Bahaman caracara (Caracara creightoni), also known as Creighton's caracara, is an extinct bird of prey. It is known only from a few fossils discovered in the Bahamas and Cuba. Caracara creightoni was a scavenger and opportunistic species instead of a predator like its sister extant species (C. plancus). It lived during the late Pleistocene to the beginning of the Holocene era.

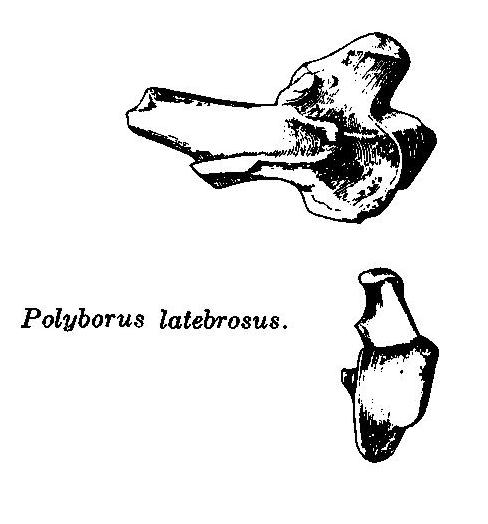
Caracara latebrosus holotype, possible senior synonym

C. creightoni stood 58 cm tall, was short-winged and likely a poor flier. This species went extinct as a result of humans arriving on its home islands and wiping out the bird's prey species. A 2,500 year old C. creightoni femur from an Abaco Islands blue hole yielded a nearly complete mitochondrial genome. The DNA shows that the species was closely related to the crested caracara. The two species last shared a common ancestor between 1.2 and 0.4 million years ago, during the Pleistocene.
