= Chelonoidis monensis =

Chelonoidis monensis Temporal range: Late Pleistocene–Late Holocene

Scientific classification
- Kingdom: Animalia
- Phylum: Chordata
- Class: Reptilia
- Order: Testudines
- Suborder: Cryptodira
- Family: Testudinidae
- Genus: Chelonoidis
- Species: †C. monensis

Binomial name
- †Chelonoidis monensis Williams, 1952

Synonyms
- Synonymy: Testudo monensis; Geochelone monensis; Monachelys monensis

Extinct species of tortoise

Chelonoidis monensis, also known as the Mona tortoise, is an extinct species of land tortoise that lived on the island of Mona, Puerto Rico, from the Late Pleistocene to around 1000 BCE. Evidence for the latter date includes cave drawings. All fossil remains have been found either in or near Liro Cave on the east side of Mona. It had a carapace length of around 50 cm (20 in).
