= Bermuda saw-whet owl =

Conservation status
- Extinct (1600s) (IUCN 3.1)

Scientific classification
- Kingdom: Animalia
- Phylum: Chordata
- Class: Aves
- Order: Strigiformes
- Family: Strigidae
- Genus: Aegolius
- Species: †A. gradyi

Binomial name
- †Aegolius gradyi Olson, 2012

Extinct species of owl

The Bermuda saw-whet owl (Aegolius gradyi) is an extinct species of owl that was endemic to Bermuda. It was described from fossil records and explorer accounts of the bird in the 17th century.

== Extinction ==
The cause of its extinction is unknown, but it may have been related to the decline of Bermuda cedar and Bermuda palmetto trees, or the arrival of non-native predators and competitors after human colonization. First described in 2012, it was declared extinct in 2014 (though the extinction itself was in the 17th century).
