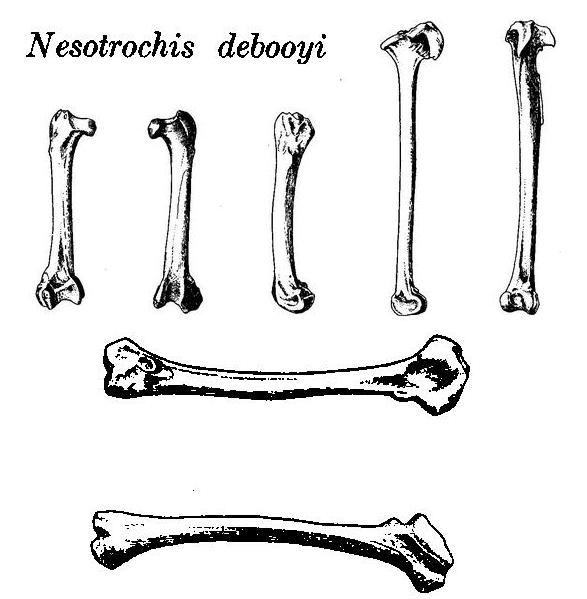
- leg and foot bones of Nesotrochis debooyi

Scientific classification
- Kingdom: Animalia
- Phylum: Chordata
- Class: Aves
- Order: Gruiformes
- Family: †Nesotrochidae
- Genus: †Nesotrochis; Wetmore, 1918

Species
- †N. debooyi Wetmore, 1918; †N. picapicensis Fischer & Stephan, 1971; †N. steganinos Olson, 1974

= Nesotrochis =

Nesotrochis Temporal range: Late Pleistocene to Holocene

Extinct genus of birds

Nesotrochis is a genus of extinct flightless birds that were endemic to the islands of the Greater Antilles in the Caribbean. They have often been called cave rails, though they are no longer considered true rails, but an independent lineage of gruiform birds.

== Taxonomy ==
It contains 3 species known from subfossil remains of Late Pleistocene and Holocene age found in cave deposits. Previously considered rails in the family Rallidae, In 2021, DNA analysis of a complete mitochondrial genome of N. steganinos indicated that they were not rails but an independent lineage of gruiform birds, with their closest relatives being the family Sarothruridae native to Africa, Madagascar, New Guinea and Wallacea, and the extinct adzebills of New Zealand.

=== Species ===
- Antillean cave rail, Nesotrochis debooyi (Puerto Rico, U.S. Virgin Islands) - may have survived until historic times
- Cuban cave rail, Nesotrochis picapicensis (Cuba) - prehistoric
- Haitian cave rail, Nesotrochis steganinos (Hispaniola - Haiti) - prehistoric

== Description ==
Due to their similar but larger body dimensions when compared to actual rails, the West Indian cave rails are considered examples of insular gigantism, as well as of convergent evolution.
