= Chelonoidis cubensis =

Chelonoidis cubensis Temporal range: Late Pleistocene–Early Holocene

Scientific classification
- Kingdom: Animalia
- Phylum: Chordata
- Class: Reptilia
- Order: Testudines
- Suborder: Cryptodira
- Family: Testudinidae
- Genus: Chelonoidis
- Species: †C. cubensis

Binomial name
- †Chelonoidis cubensis Leidy, 1868

Synonyms
- Synonymy: Testudo cubensis; Geochelone cubensis; Hesperotestudo cubensis

Extinct species of tortoise

Chelonoidis cubensis, also known as the Cuban giant tortoise, is an extinct species of land tortoise that lived in Cuba from the Late Pleistocene to the Early Holocene. It had a carapace length of between 40 cm and 90 cm. It is thought that the species went extinct through human exploitation.
