= Cayman nesophontes =

Cayman nesophontes Temporal range: Late Pleistocene-Holocene

Conservation status
- Extinct (c.1632-1774)

Scientific classification
- Kingdom: Animalia
- Phylum: Chordata
- Class: Mammalia
- Order: Eulipotyphla
- Family: †Nesophontidae
- Genus: †Nesophontes
- Species: †N. hemincingulus

Binomial name
- †Nesophontes hemincingulus Morgan et al., 2019

Extinct species of mammal

The Cayman nesophontes (Nespohontes hemicingulus) is an extinct eulipotyphlan of the genus Nesophontes that was once endemic to the Cayman Islands (Grand Cayman and Cayman Brac); the animal lived in the island montane forest/brush endemic to the Cayman Islands and was an insectivore. It is known from subfossil remains, that bear bite marks attributed to crocodiles, collected from caves, sinkholes and peat deposits on the Islands between the 1930s and the 1990s. It was named in 2019.

== Extinction ==
It is believed that the animal was never observed by Europeans. Contemporary fossils with indigenous artifacts and introduced rat fossils indicate survival into the colonial era, possibly until the 16th century. It disappeared after introduction of rats (starting from May 10, 1503, AD with the arrival of Christopher Columbus at the Cayman Islands) and due to the destruction of its forest habitat, although this species may have survived until around 1774 AD. Using analysis of existing and new radiometric dates (of which the existing dates mainly point towards an extinction date of pre-1600 AD for the Nesophontes genus as a whole), an estimated extinction date of 1700 AD (95% confidence interval = 1632–1774 AD) was estimated for N. hemicingulus in 2019.
