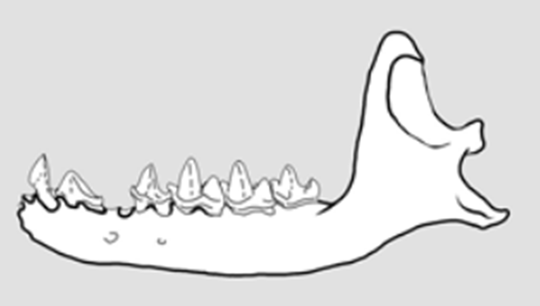
- Jaw of a male N. micrus

Conservation status
- Extinct (1500s) (IUCN 3.1)

Scientific classification
- Kingdom: Animalia
- Phylum: Chordata
- Class: Mammalia
- Order: Eulipotyphla
- Family: †Nesophontidae
- Genus: †Nesophontes
- Species: †N. micrus

Binomial name
- †Nesophontes micrus G.M. Allen, 1917

Synonyms
- Nesophontes longirostris Anthony, 1919; Nesophontes submicrus Arredondo, 1970; Nesophontes superstes Fischer, 1977

= Western Cuban nesophontes =

Extinct species of mammal

The western Cuban nesophontes (Nesophontes micrus) is an extinct species of mammal in the family Nesophontidae. It was found on Cuba and Hispaniola. It was recently discovered to include three previously thought species: N. submicrus, N. longirostris, and N. superstes.
