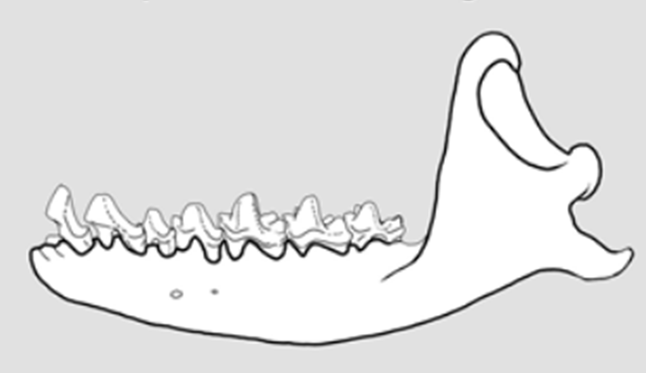
- Jaw of a male N. major

Conservation status
- Extinct (1500s) (IUCN 3.1)

Scientific classification
- Kingdom: Animalia
- Phylum: Chordata
- Class: Mammalia
- Order: Eulipotyphla
- Family: †Nesophontidae
- Genus: †Nesophontes
- Species: †N. major

Binomial name
- †Nesophontes major Arredondo, 1970

= Greater Cuban nesophontes =

Extinct species of mammal

The greater Cuban nesophontes (Nesophontes major) is an extinct species of eulipotyphlan that was native to Cuba. It is thought that the introduction of rats lead to its demise.
