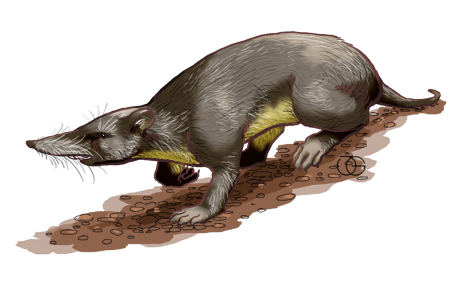

Conservation status
- Extinct (1500s) (IUCN 3.1)

Scientific classification
- Kingdom: Animalia
- Phylum: Chordata
- Class: Mammalia
- Order: Eulipotyphla
- Family: †Nesophontidae
- Genus: †Nesophontes
- Species: †N. edithae

Binomial name
- †Nesophontes edithae Anthony, 1916

= Puerto Rican nesophontes =

Extinct species of mammal

The Puerto Rican nesophontes (Nesophontes edithae), or Puerto Rican shrew, is an extinct eulipotyphlan endemic to Puerto Rico.

It is believed that the animal was never observed by Europeans. Contemporary fossils with indigenous artefacts and introduced rat fossils indicate survival into the colonial era, possibly until the 16th century. The shrew lived in the island montane forest/brush endemic to western Puerto Rico and was an insectivore. There are fossil specimens located in London. It disappeared after introduction of rats and due to the destruction of its forest habitat.

== See also ==
- List of extinct animals
- List of endemic fauna of Puerto Rico
