= Haitian nesophontes =

Conservation status
- Extinct (IUCN 3.1)

Scientific classification
- Kingdom: Animalia
- Phylum: Chordata
- Class: Mammalia
- Order: Eulipotyphla
- Family: †Nesophontidae
- Genus: †Nesophontes
- Species: †N. zamicrus

Binomial name
- †Nesophontes zamicrus Miller, 1929

Extinct species of mammal

The Haitian nesophontes (Nesophontes zamicrus) is an extinct species of mammal in the family Nesophontidae. It was endemic to Hispaniola in the Caribbean (in both the Dominican Republic and Haiti).
