= Atalaye nesophontes =

Conservation status
- Extinct (IUCN 3.1)

Scientific classification
- Kingdom: Animalia
- Phylum: Chordata
- Class: Mammalia
- Order: Eulipotyphla
- Family: †Nesophontidae
- Genus: †Nesophontes
- Species: †N. hypomicrus

Binomial name
- †Nesophontes hypomicrus Miller, 1929

Extinct species of mammal endemic to Hispaniola

The Atalaye nesophontes (Nesophontes hypomicrus) is an extinct species of mammal in the family Nesophontidae. It was endemic to Hispaniola in the Caribbean (in both Haiti and the Dominican Republic), and is only known from fossil deposits.
