= St. Michel nesophontes =

Conservation status
- Extinct (early or the late 1500s) (IUCN 3.1)

Scientific classification
- Kingdom: Animalia
- Phylum: Chordata
- Class: Mammalia
- Order: Eulipotyphla
- Family: †Nesophontidae
- Genus: †Nesophontes
- Species: †N. paramicrus

Binomial name
- †Nesophontes paramicrus Miller, 1929

Extinct species of mammal endemic to Hispaniola

The St. Michel nesophontes (Nesophontes paramicrus) is an extinct species of mammal in the family Nesophontidae. It was endemic to Hispaniola (today Haiti and the Dominican Republic).

== Taxonomy ==
A phylogenetic study in 2016, based on DNA extracted and carbon-dated from a specimen about 750 years old, suggests their nearest relatives are the solenodons, although the two groups diverged more than 40 million years ago.

== History ==
The type specimen was collected in Cueva de Bosque Humido, Los Haitises National Park, Hato Mayor Province, Dominican Republic.
