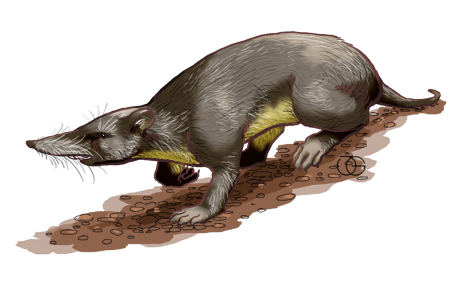
- Nesophontes edithae

Conservation status
- Extinct (c. 1700)

Scientific classification
- Kingdom: Animalia
- Phylum: Chordata
- Class: Mammalia
- Order: Eulipotyphla
- Family: †Nesophontidae; Anthony, 1916
- Genus: †Nesophontes; Anthony, 1916

Species
- †Nesophontes edithae †Nesophontes hemicingulus †Nesophontes hypomicrus †Nesophontes major †Nesophontes micrus †Nesophontes paramicrus †Nesophontes zamicrus

= Nesophontes =

Nesophontes Temporal range: Quaternary

Extinct family of mammals

Nesophontes, sometimes called West Indies shrews, is the sole genus of the extinct, monotypic mammal family Nesophontidae in the order Eulipotyphla. These animals were small insectivores, about 5 to 15 cm long, with a long, slender snout, head and long tail. They were endemic to the Greater Antilles (except Jamaica), Cuba, Hispaniola (now the Dominican Republic and Haiti), Puerto Rico, the United States Virgin Islands, and the Cayman Islands.

== Extinction ==
Although reliable estimates are unavailable, these animals are confirmed to have survived the Pleistocene extinction, since remains have been found among Rattus and Mus species. Some authorities estimate extinction coinciding with the arrival of rats aboard Spanish vessels in the early 16th century (1500). Others, such as Morgan and Woods, claim that some species survived until the early 20th century. A phylogenetic study in 2016, based on DNA extracted from a specimen about 750 years old, suggests their nearest relatives are the solenodons. However, the two groups diverged more than 40 million years ago.

The West Indies shrews have been described only from fossil records and skeletal material in owl pellets found in the Greater Antilles and surrounding islands. Recent efforts to locate surviving populations have been unsuccessful. Although some Nesophontes remains in owl pellets have been reported as fresh-appearing, radiocarbon dating has failed to support any post-16th century dates, suggesting that the nesophontids became extinct very rapidly at approximately the time of European discovery and settlement of the Greater Antilles. However, the Cayman nesophontes possibly survived until around 1632 to 1774, with a likely extinction date of c. 1700.

== Species ==
Since Nesophontes species have only been observed through fossil records, the exact number of species varies among authorities. Some claim as many as 12 valid species, while others claim as few as six.

- Puerto Rican nesophontes (Nesophontes edithae)
- Cayman nesophontes (Nesophontes hemicingulus)
- Atalaye nesophontes (Nesophontes hypomicrus)
- Greater Cuban nesophontes (Nesophontes major)
- Western Cuban nesophontes (Nesophontes micrus)
- St. Michel nesophontes (Nesophontes paramicrus)
- Haitian nesophontes (Nesophontes zamicrus)

== See also ==
- Giant hutia
- List of extinct animals
- List of eulipotyphlans of the Caribbean
