= Rajyotsava Awards (2006) =

Awards given by the government of Karnataka, India

2006 Rajyotsava Awards
- Date: 1 November 2006
- Location: Bangalore, Karnataka
- Country: India
- Presented by: Government of Karnataka

The list of Karnataka Rajyotsava Award recipients for the year 2006 is below.

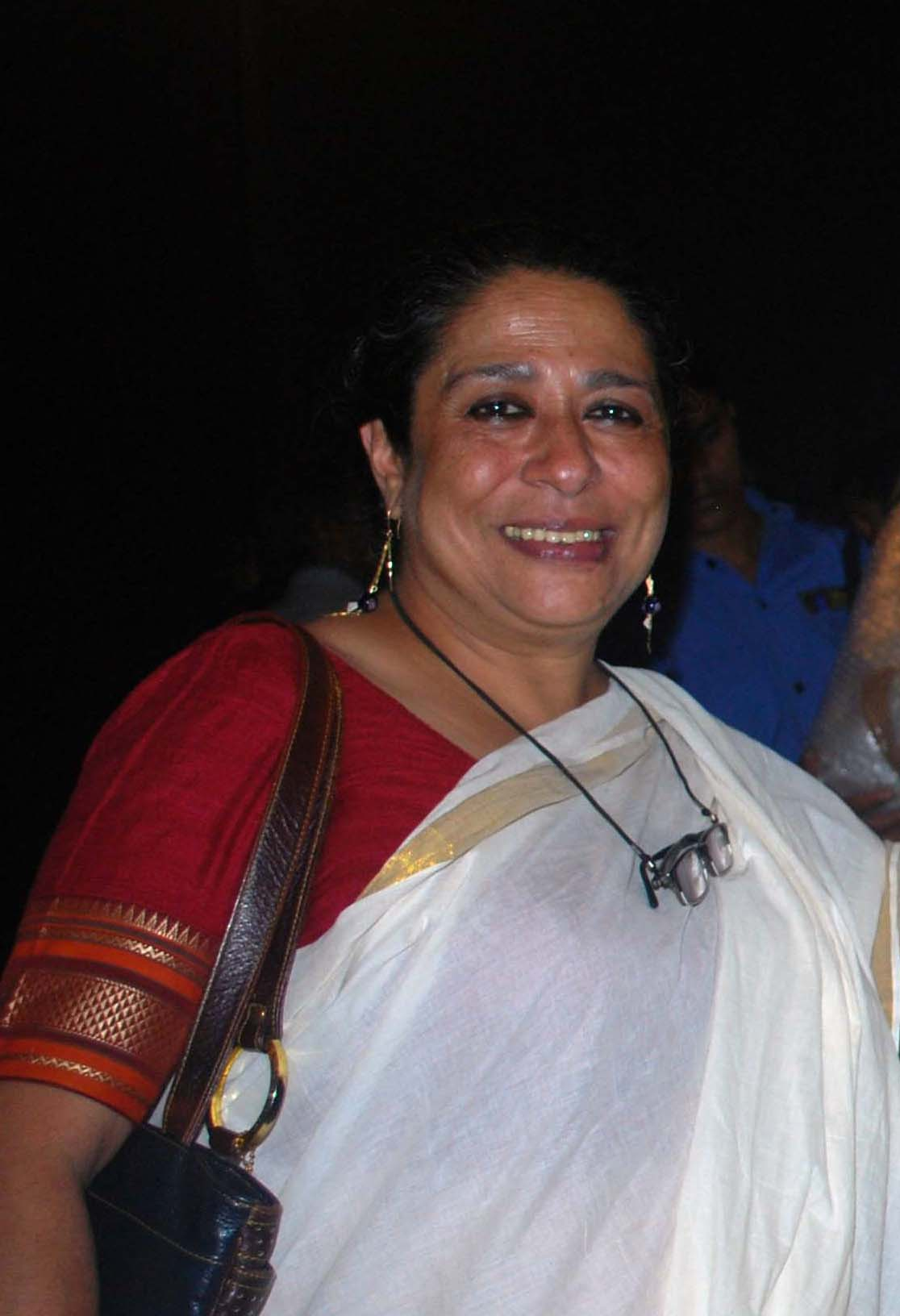
Arundhati Nag

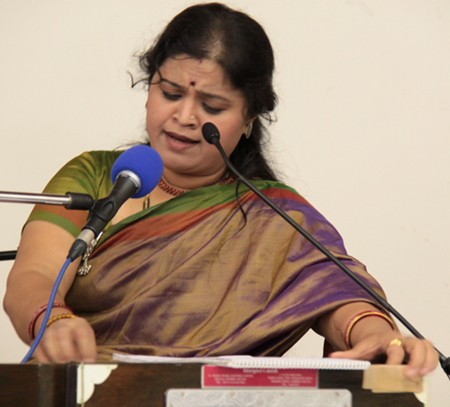
Sangeeta Katti

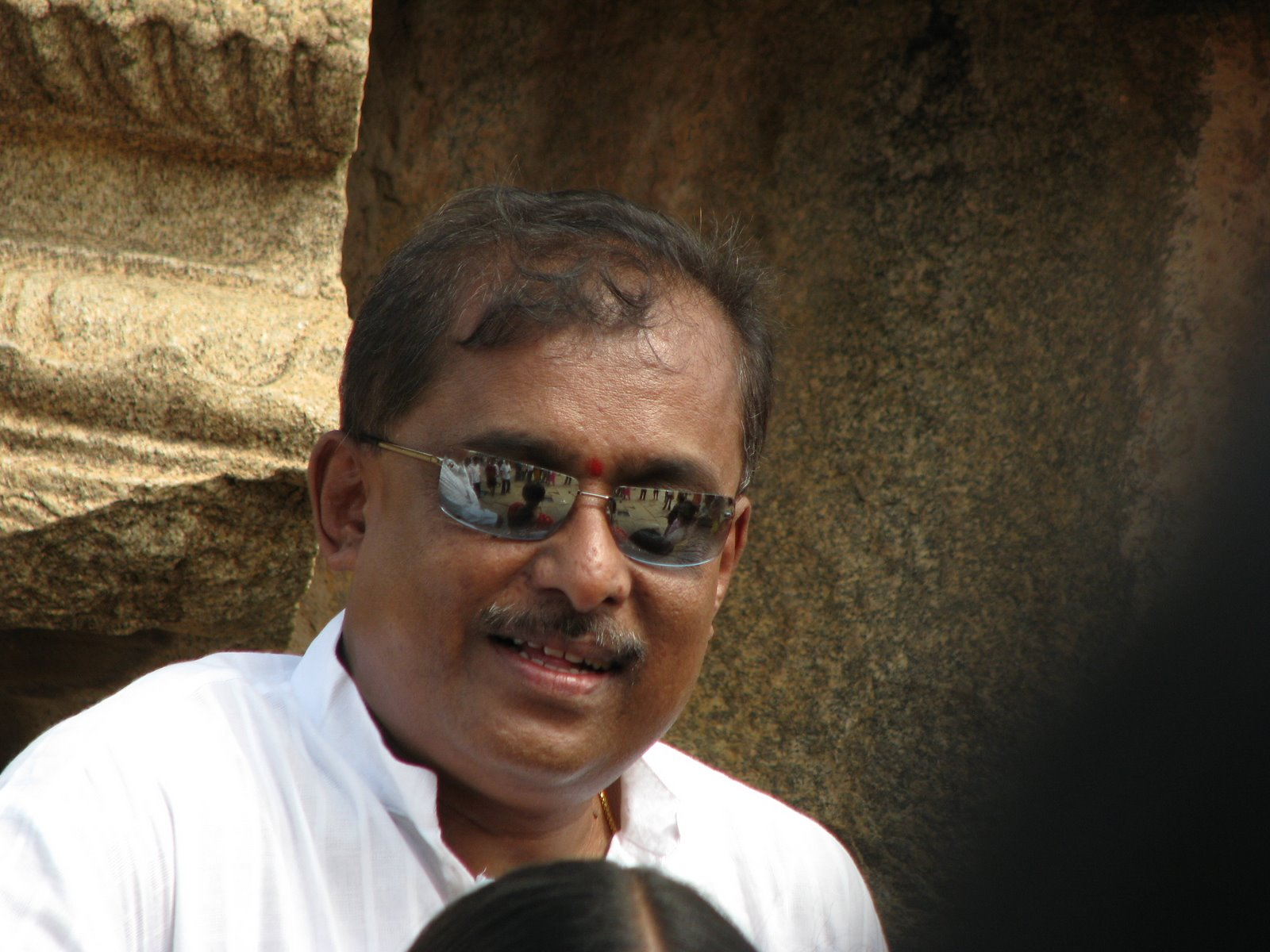
Hamsalekha

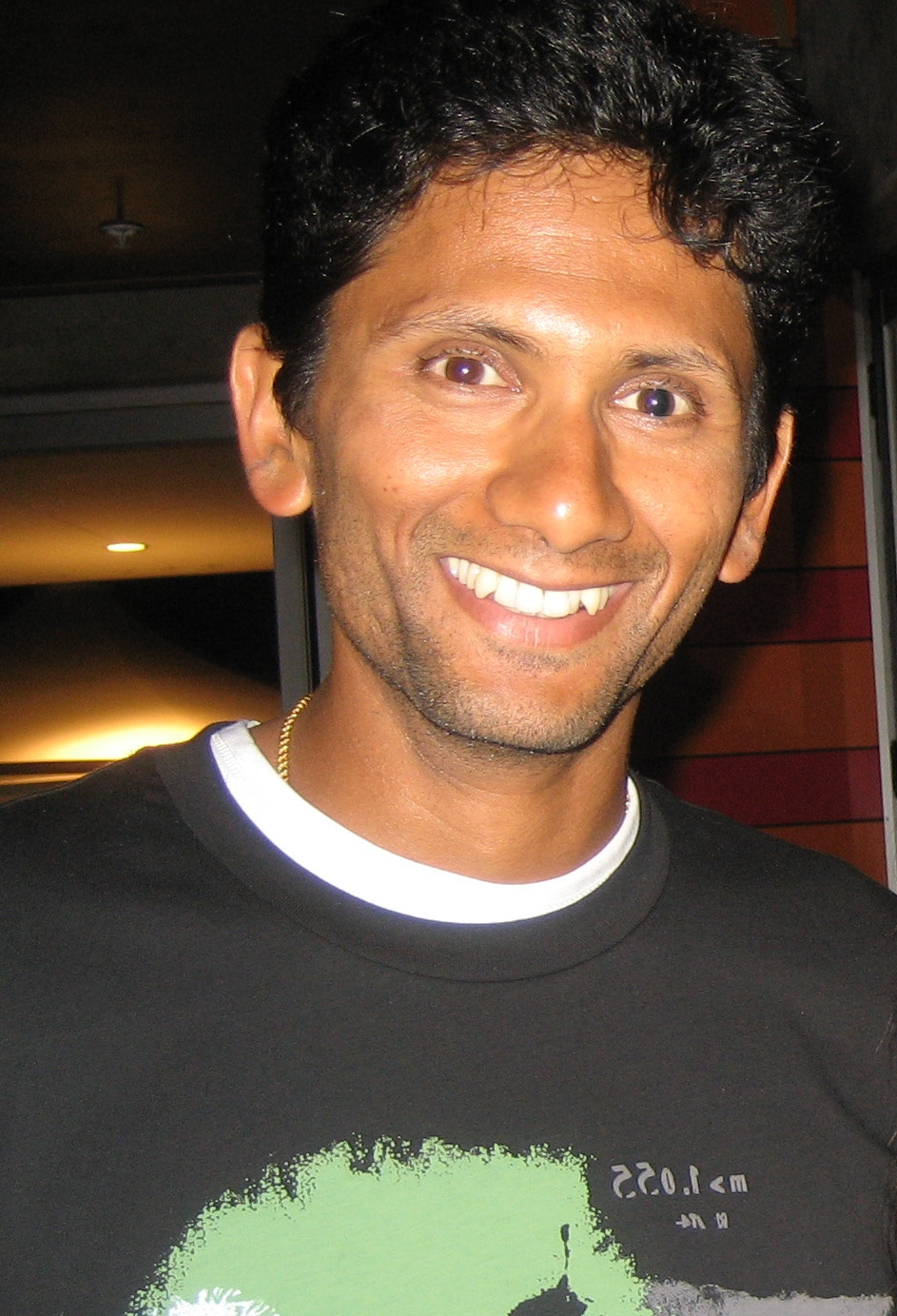
Venkatesh Prasad

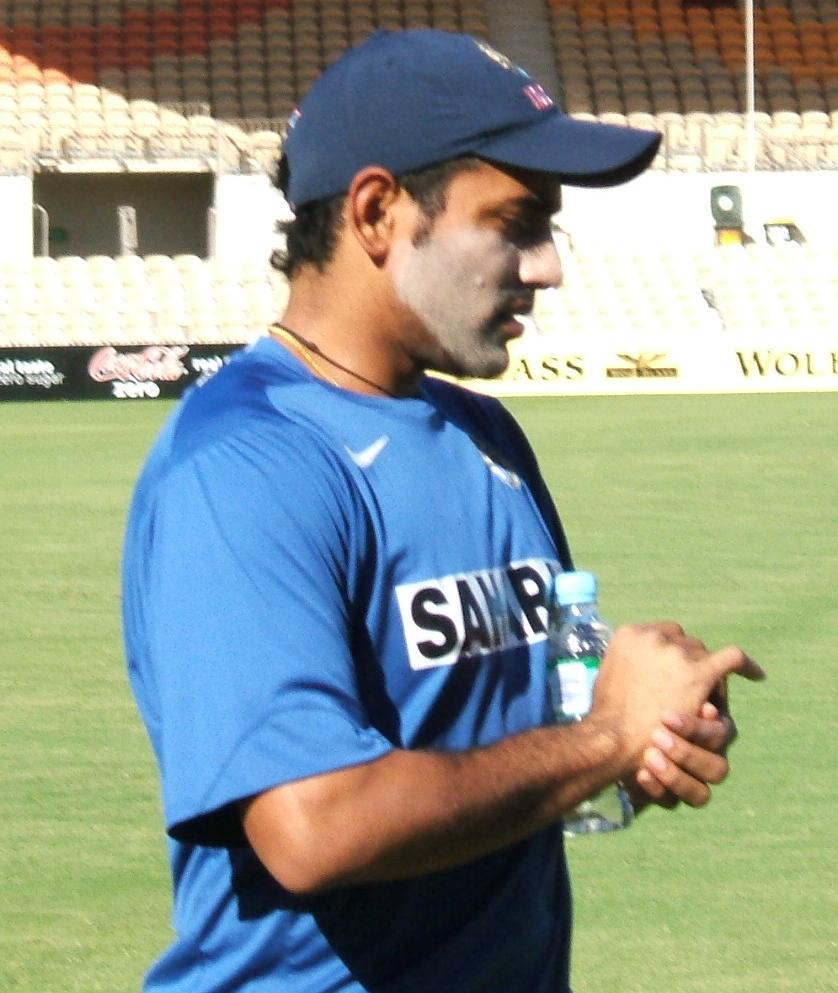
Robin Uthappa

Recipient	Field
Vasanth Kushtagi	Literature
Earya Lakshminarayana Alva	Literature
Vishnu Naika	Literature
Kalegowda Nagavara	Literature
Sumithramma	Theatre
T. S. Lohithashwa	Theatre
Arundhati Nag	Theatre
Shripathi Manjanabylu	Theatre
H. S. Ramachandre Gowda	Folklore
Masthamma	Folklore
Gopalakrishna Kurup	Folklore
Gangadhara Gowda	Folklore
Malloja Mayachar Shilpi	Sculpture
Rekha Rao	Fine Arts
J. M. S. Mani	Fine Arts
Sadanand Kanavalli	Art Critic
Shah Rashid Ahmed Khadri	Handicrafts
Prabhakar Kore	Education
Thukaramsa Vittalsa Kabaadi	Music
Naganath Odeyar	Music
V. A. Ramdas	Music
Sangeetha Katti	Music
Padmini Rao	Dance
B. T. Chidananda Murthy	Medicine
Devadhar	Medicine
Vasishta	Medicine
B. S. Dwarakish	Cinema
G. Hamsalekha	Cinema
S. Doddanna	Cinema
S. Narayan	Cinema
K. N. Shanthakumar	Journalism
G. S. Sadashiva	Journalism
Shyam Sundar	Journalism
K. Puttaswamy	
Krupakar	Wildlife Photography
Senani	Wildlife Photography
M. K. Soorappa	Science
Venkatesh Prasad	Sports
Robin Uthappa	Sports
C. H. Hanumantharaya	Law
H. Gangadharan	Law
H. G. Govinde Gowda	Social Work
RUDSET	Social Work / Institution
Churdiya Charitable Trust	Social Work / Institution
Abu Dhabi Kannada Sangha	Overseas / Institution
Karnataka Sangha, Mumbai	Overseas / Institution
D. N. Desai	Irrigation
A. V. Somanath Dikshit	Scholar
Mahesh Joshi	Journalism
K. R. Sushile Gowda	Youth Service Education
