= Krupakar-Senani =

Indian wildlife photographers

Krupakar and Senani are wildlife photographers from Karnataka, India. Their pictures have been published in international magazines including GEO, The Times, People, BBC Wildlife and Nature. Oxford Scientific Films, UK, market their photographs. Presently, they are producing a film on wild dogs for Discovery Channel.

== Before photography ==
Krupakar studied business administration at D. Banumaiah's College in Mysore where he played cricket for Mysore University. He also worked as a journalist in Mangalore and later in Bangalore before taking up photography professionally with Senani Hegde.

Senani Hegde is a graduate in civil engineering from Jayachamarajendra College of Engineering in Mysore. He gave up a lucrative construction business to pursue wildlife photography with Krupakar. Together they wrote photo essays for popular magazines. In the beginning, they studied small birds in Mandya district, capturing the life of capricious birds and recorded their adaptation to changing habitat. Simultaneously, they wrote popular articles on these birds recording their experiences and weaving sociological aspects. Later they moved to Mudumalai Wildlife Sanctuary in Tamil Nadu.

== Wild Dog Diaries ==
They produced the wildlife film Wild Dog Diaries for National Geographic Channel. For this documentary they won the following awards:

- Festival de l'Oiseau et de la Nature 2008 (Abbeville, France) – Best Nature Documentary Award
- Japan Wildlife Film Festival 2007 (Toyama, Japan) – Best of Festival Grand Award
- CMS Vatavaran Environment and Wildlife Film Festival 2007 (New Delhi, India) – Best of Festival Award and Best Story Award
- Asian Television Awards 2007 (Singapore) – Best Natural History and Wildlife Programme
- Wildscreen 2006 (Bristol, UK) – nominated for Panda Award
- NaturVision 2006 (Neuschoenau, Germany) – nominated for Best International Film.

The film was also shown by ARTE in France and Germany.

== Namma Sangha ==
Krupakar and Senani, along with the then forest officer D Yathish Kumar, have been instrumental in the formation and functioning of Namma Sangha, a conservation effort on the fringes of Bandipur National Park in south India. The society has been very successful in reducing the pressure of removal of fuelwood from the forest, by introducing cooking gas in the villages around the park.

The society's network includes 194 villages, and so far 29,000 families are using cooking gas. The uniqueness of this project was funded entirely by friends and well-wishers, without any foreign and government assistance. The project is now self-sustained, and has become a model for other such endeavours.

== The Pack ==
In October 2010, Krupakar and Senani won the prestigious Green Oscar award for their film on dhole The Pack in the prestigious Wildscreen Film Festival held in Bristol, UK. The Pack was produced and directed in the dense forests of Nilgiris for over a decade and unfolds the lifestyle of dhole. It was the first film produced and directed in Asia to be nominated for this award and competed against David Attenborough's Life Stories and another film by the National Geographic channel. Krupakar and Senani received the honours from noted scientist George Schaller.

== Kidnap By Veerappan ==
Krupakar and Senani both were kidnapped by the Indian bandit Veerappan in October 1997 mistaking them for important government officials, after holding them captive for two weeks, he released them.

== Other honours and awards ==
In addition to the awards listed or mentioned above:

- They received Karnataka Rajyothsava Award in 2006, the state's highest award, from the Government of Karnataka, for their overall contribution to the field of photography.
- Their book Jeeva Jaala, co-authored with K. Puttaswamy, won the Karnataka Sahitya Academy Award 1999 for science writing.
