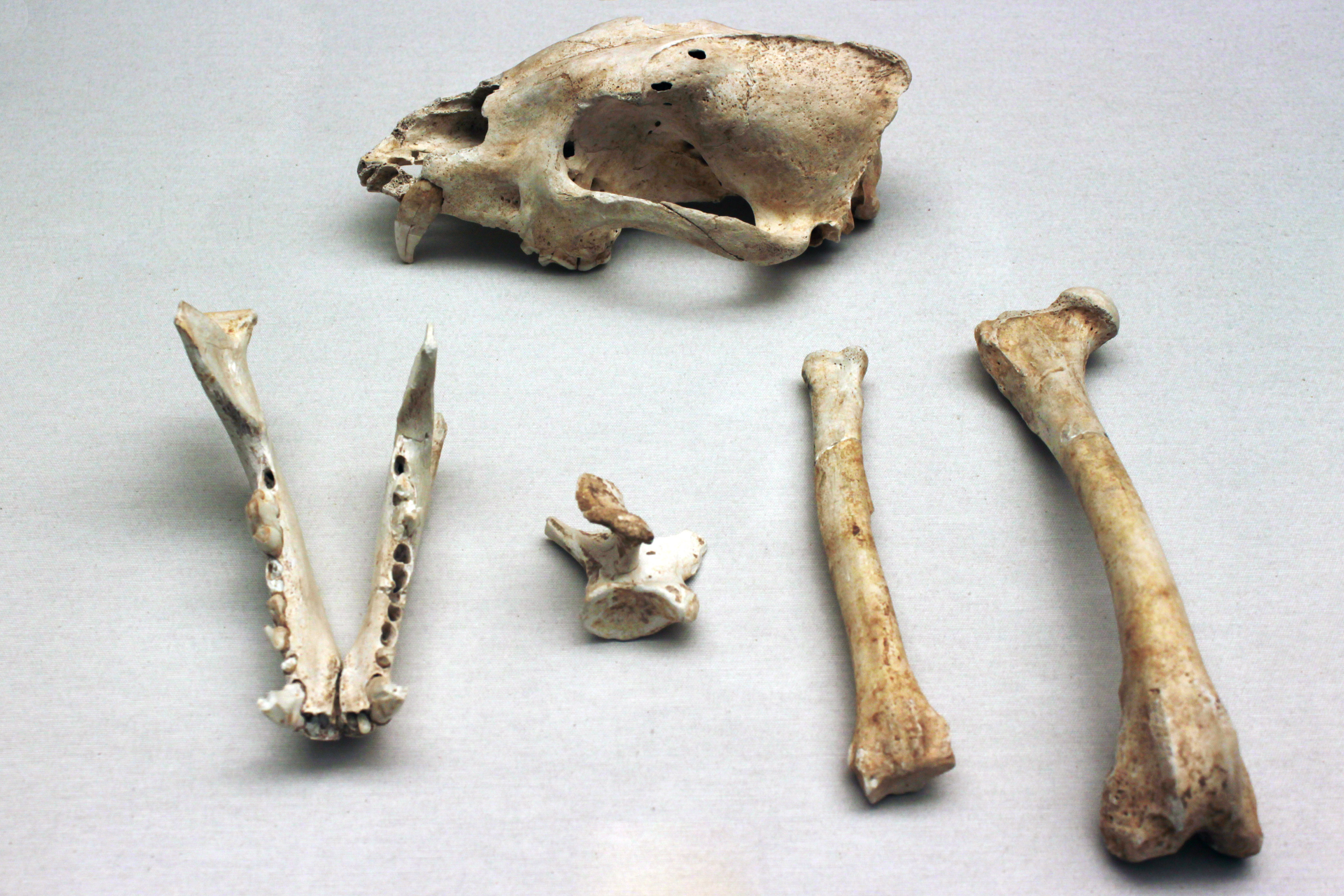
- Skeletal remains dating back to upper Würm period from Cova del Parpalló, Gandía, Valencia, Spain
- Life restoration

Scientific classification
- Kingdom: Animalia
- Phylum: Chordata
- Class: Mammalia
- Infraclass: Placentalia
- Order: Carnivora
- Family: Canidae
- Genus: Cuon
- Species: C. alpinus
- Subspecies: †C. a. europaeus

Trinomial name
- †Cuon alpinus europaeus Bourguignat, 1868

= European dhole =

Middle and Late Pleistocene paleosubspecies of the dhole

The European dhole (Cuon alpinus europaeus) was a paleosubspecies of the dhole, which ranged throughout much of Western and Central Europe during the Middle and Late Pleistocene. Like the modern Asiatic populations, it was a more progressive form than other prehistoric members of the genus Cuon, having transformed its lower molar tooth into a single cusped slicer. It was virtually indistinguishable from its modern counterpart, save for its greater size, which closely approached that of the gray wolf.

== Lineage ==
Cuon alpinus priscus Thenius 1954 was the first member of genus Cuon to be identified in Europe during the Middle Pleistocene. This was followed by Cuon alpinus fossilis Nehring 1890, then Cuon alpinus europaeus Bourguignat 1868 during the Middle and Late Pleistocene. The descent is thought to be C. a. priscus→C. a. fossilis→C. a. europaeus. In comparison, Cuon alpinus antiquus Colbert & Hooijer 1953 was active in the Middle Pleistocene of China, and Cuon alpinus caucasicus Baryshnikov 1996 was active in the Late Pleistocene of the Caucasus.

The European dhole became extinct in much of Europe during the late Würm period, though it may have survived in the Iberian Peninsula until the early Holocene.

== Competition ==
Between 650–450 thousand years ago in Europe, the open lands were dominated by Lycaon lycaonoides, while Cuon alpinus priscus preferred forests, highlands, and mountains. The early small wolf Canis mosbachensis coexisted in all of these environments. Between 480–430 thousand years ago the number and range of L. lycaonoides began to fall, and it became extinct across Eurasia between 450– 400 thousand years ago. Between 400–300 thousand years ago, the dhole and the wolf were still similar in size, but the wolf was slowly getting bigger. Between 300–250 thousand years ago, the wolf took over the dominant niche which had once been occupied by L. lycaonoides. Due to competition with the wolf, C. alpinus then decreased in body size and adapted to hunting and living in forests, highlands, and mountains.

The European dhole is known directly to have interacted with humans in the Iberian Peninsula. Evidence for this comes from symbolically arranged bones from a Gravettian site in Asturias.
