= Sangeetha Katti =

Sangeeta Katti Kulkarni
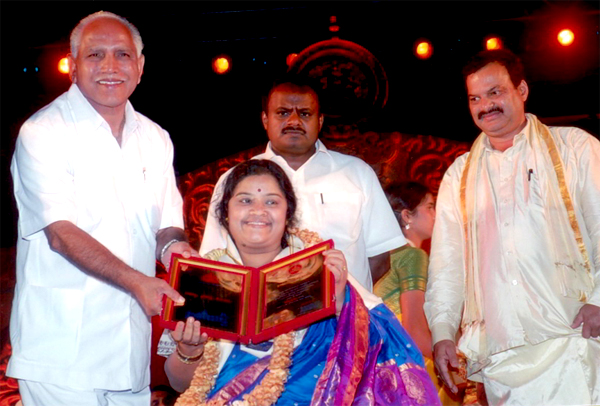
- Katti Receiving Karnataka Rajyotsava Award in 2006 From CM & Deputy CM

Background information
- Born: 7 October 1970 (age 56); Dharwad, Mysore State (present–day Karnataka), India
- Genres: Hindustani classical music, Sugama Sangeetha, playback
- Occupations: Singer, musician, composer
- Years active: 1975–present
- Website: www.sangeetakatti.com
- Title: Sangeeta Bharati
- Spouse: Manmohan Kulkarni
- Children: 2
- Parent(s): H. A. Katti; Bharati Katti

Sangeeta Katti Kulkarni, is an Indian playback singer, Hindustani classical vocalist, musician, music composer from Karnataka. She was awarded the Karnataka Rajyotsava Award in 2006 by the Government of Karnataka which is also the highest civilian award in the state.

== Introduction ==
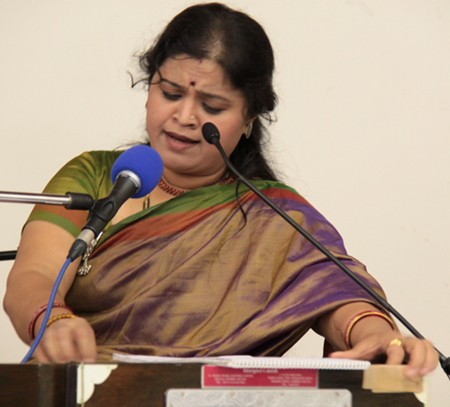
Concert in APKO New Zealand

Sangeeta Katti was born in Dharwad in Karnataka. She is a daughter of Dr. H. A . Katti and Bharati Katti, on 7 October 1970.

Sangeeta Katti has a performance experience in Hindustani Vocal as well as Bhajans, Vachanas, Dasavani, Abhangs, Bhavageet, Folk Music and Playback singing.

Sangeeta Katti is a graduate in chemistry (with distinction) and well versed in several languages like Kannada, Hindi, English, Marathi etc. Sangeeta Katti won several awards for her compositions and albums.

Sangeeta Katti has worked with the leading music directors including Upendra Kumar, M. Ranga Rao, Vijaya Bhaskar, M. M. Keervani, C. Ashwath, Hamsalekha and others and sung in nine Indian languages with M. Balamurali Krishna, K. J. Yesudas, S. P. Balasubrahmanyam, Rajkumar, P. B. Srinivas and others. Sangeeta is an 'A' grade artist in Classical and Light Music both on AIR and television.

She has toured abroad, all over UK, USA, Australia, New Zealand, Gulf and Canada and other countries performing live concerts.

== Childhood ==
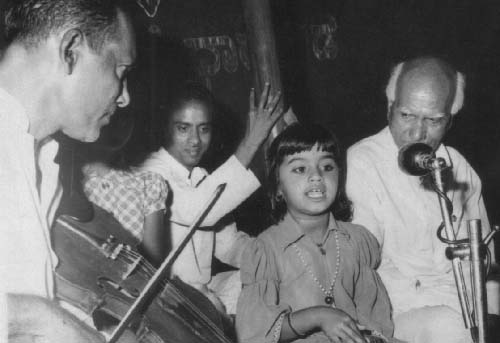
First Concert at age 4

Sangeeta Katti received initial lessons from her father. At the age of four, she met Naushad Ali which she considered a turning point in her life. Naushad Ali asked her to sing some ragas and was impressed by the child prodigy and since then she became his student. Trained initially under Sri Sheshagiri Dandapur and Pt. Chanderashekhar Puranikmath, Sangeeta received advanced training in classical vocals from Padmabhushan Pt. Basavaraj Rajguru of Kirana & Gwalior Gharana for about 12 years. She is presently under the tutelage of Padmavibushana Gana Sarswati Smt Kishori Amonkar of the Jaipur-Atrauli Gharana

== Others ==
Sangeeta Katti to date has more than 7000 + concerts to her credit, her very first performance being at the age of four. She has also performed in the United States, UK, New Zealand and Canada. She is a regular feature in most of the important music festivals in India. She was a teaching faculty in Hindustani Vocal music at Bharathiya Vidya Bhavan, Bengaluru.

== Playback singing ==
Sangeetha Katti has sung several songs and her songs in the film Nagamandala like Ee Hasiru Siriyali and Kambada Myalina Bombeye have been widely acclaimed. She mainly works in Kannada movies as well as a few Tamil Movies.

== List of concerts ==
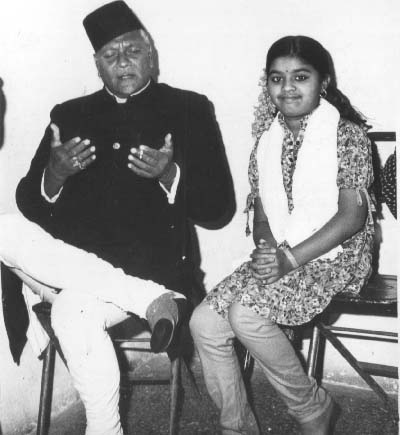
Sangeeta Katti with Ustad BISMILLA KHAN

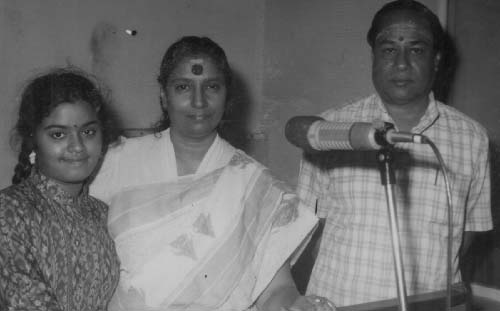
Sangeeta Katti with Famous Singer S.Janaki

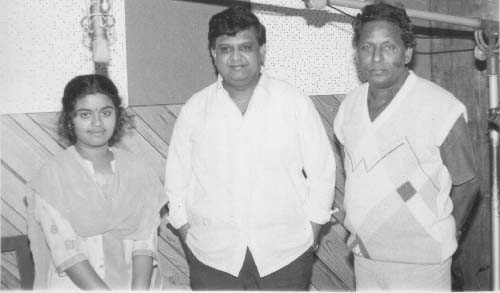
Sangeeta Katti with Famous Singer S.P.Balasubramanyam in one of her recordings

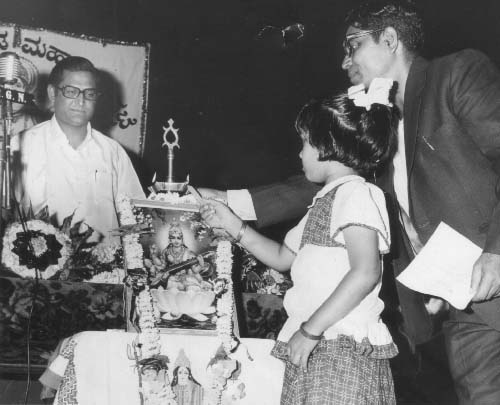
Sangeeta Katti as Chief Guest at one of the functions in her Childhood, Dharwad

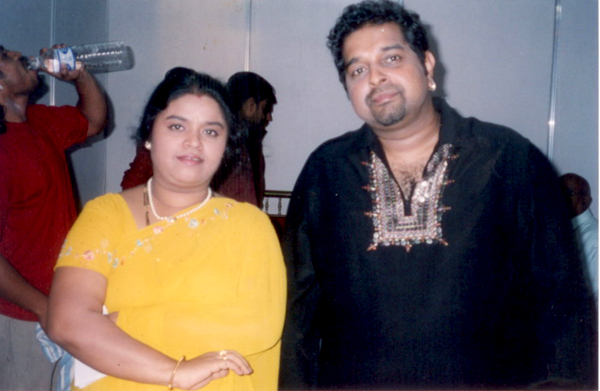
Sangeeta Katti With Shankar Mahadevan

1. Mysore Dasara (Darbar Hall) festival in 1983, 1987, 1999, 2005, 2008, 2014.
2. 51st Sawai Gandharva Sangeetotsav, Pune – December 2003.
3. Hampi Utsav – 1989, 1993, 1998, 2004, 2007, 2010. (A National Cultural fest conducted by Govt of Karnataka)
4. Other important state festivals like:-- Sahyadri utsav in 1998, Navsarpur utsav in 1991, Hoysala utsav in 2004, Kittur Utsav in 2004
5. The Spirit of Unity Concerts for Universal Integration – 1998 (Bobbili, Vizianagaram) 2000 (Vishakhapatnam).
6. Mahakumbha Mela, Haridwar, Uttaranchal April 2010.
7. Several other important places like Mumbai, Goa, Delhi, Nasik, Hyderabad, Pune, Chennai, Bangalore, Mantralayam and others.

Concerts in abroad

UK:

1. Vishwa Kannada Sammelana, Millennium Meet at Manchester – Aug 2000, Aug 2008 .
2. Young Kannadigas at London, Rajyotsava celebrations, Nov 2008.
3. UKKV Ugadi at Cardiss, April 2011.

USA:

1. AKKA Conventions at Houston, Texas, – Sep 2000, Detroit Michigan – Sep 2002, Orlando Florida, Sep 2004, Baltimore, MD, Sep 2006
2. Basant Bahar, California.- 2002, 2004. NA Kannadigas – 2000, 2002. Kannada Kuta LA & San Diego – 2002
3. Sri Venkateshwara Temple, Pittsburgh – 2002 and Purandara dasa day, June 2004.
4. Kannada Sangha Atlanta – 2000. VSNA Convention, Atlanta – July 2004.
5. Kannada Kuta, Hindu Temple & Other associations at Chicago – 2000, 2002, 2004, 2006, 2008
6. Sai Baba Temple, Aurora, IL- 2004
7. HTGC, Lemont IL – 2002
8. Pampa Kannada Kuta at MI, 2002, 2004. Michigan Symphony, Detroit, MI (2010). Music Community of Greater Metropolitan Detroit, MI 2002
9. Kaveri Kannada Kuta, MD – 2000, 2002, 2004 ...West Virginia & Washington DC
10. Music Community of greater Metropolitan Detroit, MI – Sep 2002
11. Triveni (Brindavan) Kannada Sanga at NJ and NY – 2000, 2002, 2004
12. CVHTS, Connecticut – 2002, 2004
13. Annual Music and Dance Festival, ICHS, Dallas, TX – 2004. Mallige Kannada Kuta, Dallas, TX – 2000.
14. Kannada Association of Northern California and Los Angeles – 2000, 2002
15. Kannada Association St. Louis – 2004
16. Mallige Kannada Sangha at Clarion Hotel Auditorium, Indianapolis, Indiana – 2004. Gita Mandal Indianapolis, Indiana – 2004
17. Swanranjali – Columbus, Ohio- 2000, 2004
18. VMS Sri Jayathirtha Aradhana Day Allentown, Pennsylvania, 2004

Canada:

1. Kannada Association – Toronto – 2000, 2004
2. Rendered Vande Mataram at The Panorama India – Indo – Canadian Cultural Fest. Toronto – 2004

Australia:

1. Successful tour (APKO) in 2009 – Sydney, Melbourne, Adelaide etc.

New Zealand:

1. APKO in 2009 – Auckland. Sangeeta Sarita in 2010 – Auckland

Hong Kong:

1. APKO – India Association, 2009

Bahrain:

1. SAARTHA Foundation in Nov 2010

Other Associations like:

1. Sunnyvale Temple, California, Birmingham – Alabama, San Diego, Evansville – IN, Louisville – KY, Hindu Temple, Detroit etc.

== Awards & recognitions ==
Sangeeta has won numerous awards. The list follows

Awards & Recognitions
A recipient of the Suvarna Karanataka Rajyotsava award 2006–2007 (Highest honour of the state.
Described as " Wonder in Music " by Sangeet Samrat Naushad Sahab, when Sangeeta was just 4 years.
Performed Classical Music as a child prodigy on children's day through 'Akash wani' in November 1975.
Received the unique blessings of Mother Teresa in the year 1977.
Recorded the first Bhajan Album Dasamanjari at the young age of 13.
1st rank to the State in Junior, Senior and Vidwat exams in Hindustani Classical Vocal.
Recipient of the AIR annual awards in Hindustani Classical and Light Music.
Represented the state of Karnataka at the National Music Festival, South Central Zone, Nagpur −1987.
Represented the state in Hindustani Classical Vocal for the "National Integration Camp" held at CCERT – NEW DELHI in 1990.
Represented Karnataka at the AKKA Conventions, UK and US.
Sung with Maestros like Mangalampalli Balamuralikrishna, K. J. Yesudas, P. B. Sreenivas, S. P. Balasubrahmanyam and Rajkumar.
Worked with the renowned music directors of South India Like Upendra Kumar, M Ranga Rao, Vijay Bhaskar, Rajan Nagendra, C. Aswath, M. M. Keeravani, Hamsalekha, Manohar and Others.
Received great words of appreciation and blessings from Bharat Ratna Pt. Ravi Shankar for singing his Thumri Compositions for Akashawani Bengaluru.
Personally Congratulated by Smt Sonia Gandhi, President AICC for rendering "Vande Mataram" at the 62nd AICC plenary session held at Bengaluru.
Lecture demo presented on the role of Women in Music and Significance of Indian Music at The OHIO State University, US.
Worked as a Composer for several Albums and Shows, researched on the project Sangeet – Sarita, an introduction of Indian Classical ragas through Indian Cinema and successfully rendered these shows all over the world.
