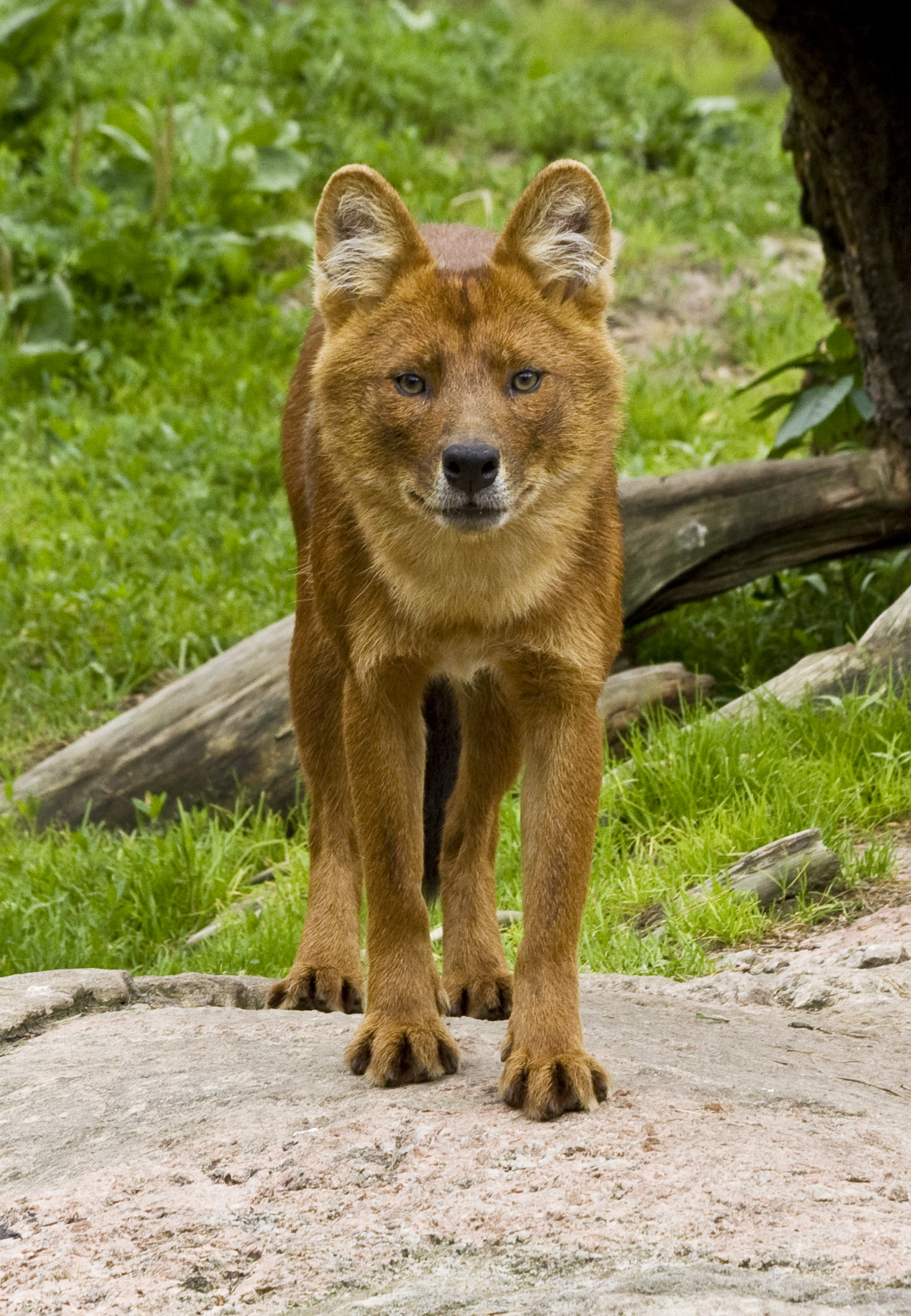
- A captive Ussuri dhole at Kolmårdens djurpark, Sweden.

Conservation status
- Endangered (IUCN 3.1)

Scientific classification
- Kingdom: Animalia
- Phylum: Chordata
- Class: Mammalia
- Order: Carnivora
- Family: Canidae
- Genus: Cuon
- Species: C. alpinus
- Subspecies: C. a. alpinus

Trinomial name
- Cuon alpinus alpinus (Pallas, 1811)

= Ussuri dhole =

Subspecies of carnivore

The Ussuri dhole (Cuon alpinus alpinus), also known as the Eastern Asiatic dhole and the Chinese dhole, is the nominate subspecies of the dhole wild dog native to Asia. The Ussuri dhole subspecies is originally native to the Russian Far East and parts of China, the Korean Peninsula and Mongolia, though it is presumed regionally extinct or extirpated in most of its historical range, and it possibly exists as fragmented populations in the Russian Far East.

== Physical descriptions ==
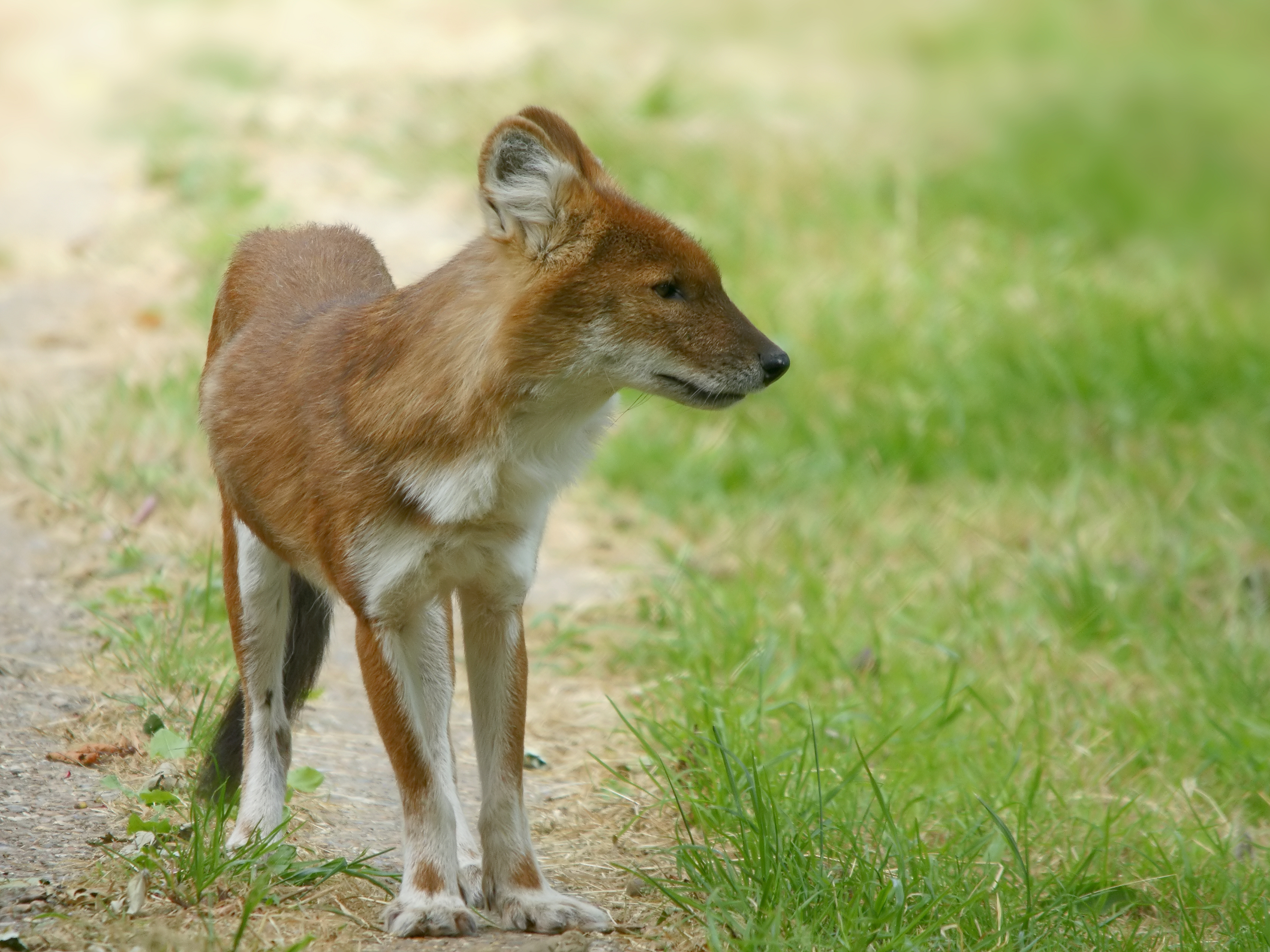
Ussuri dhole at Port Lympne Wild Animal Park, Kent, United Kingdom.

The Ussuri dhole is the largest subspecies of Cuon alpinus, and the most northerly in range, possessing a narrower skull and a bright-reddish coat with more pronounced white fur, extending from the lower jaw to the underbelly and inner legs, compared to other dholes. Much like the Tian Shan dhole (C. a. hesperius), which also inhabits cooler, temperate and seasonally-frigid environments, the Ussuri dhole grows a notably thicker coat and "mane" during the colder seasons. By springtime, and into early summer, this hair is largely shed to reveal a coarser and leaner coat for the warmer months. By comparison, the dholes of South and Southeast Asia often have permanently shorter coats—likely due to their more tropical range—consisting of dark, brick- or maroon-red fur, with little to no white hair—such as on the Indian (C. a. dukhunensis) or the Sunda dhole (C. a. sumatrensis) subspecies, for example.

== Habitat and distribution ==
The Ussuri dhole lives in forests, plains, grasslands, savannahs, steppes and alpine tundra. It is believed to be extinct in Mongolia, Russia and South Korea, with the current presence in North Korea considered uncertain. It is possible that a small population still exists in the Russian Far East, though it is extirpated in other historical ranges.

== Hunting and diet ==
The Ussuri wild dogs feed on a variety of animals, such as the wapiti, red, musk, roe and muntjac deer, wild sheep such as mouflon and argali, antelope such as goitered gazelle, chinkara, saiga, and chiru, Eurasian wild boar, grouse, pheasant, waterfowl, red junglefowl, peafowl and even the occasional red-crowned crane. They also learn hunting techniques as puppies, preying on small rodents, frogs, snakes or lizards. Injured or weak animals of numerous species will be prioritized as prey. On rare occasions, a group may attack unattended, vulnerable or juvenile equines such as kiang, onager or Mongolian wild horse, although these wild horses are generally highly protective of each other—especially of young horses—and aggressive towards predators.

== Threats and enemies ==
Dholes are listed as an endangered species due to low densities. However, threats such as poaching, illegal hunting and the fur trade no longer pose significant threats to dholes. The species is highly protected in many countries, such as in Cambodia. The dholes in certain regions are mostly threatened by lack of prey and habitat loss.

Within areas where their ranges overlap with other canids, dholes are also vulnerable to shared diseases and potentially aggressive (or deadly) confrontations with feral dogs, wolves and golden jackals. Ussuri dholes may also be targeted or threatened by fellow apex predators such as tigers, leopards, striped hyena, sloth bears, sun bears and, less frequently, by Asiatic lions (in India's Gir Forest, Gujarat) and cheetahs (in Kuno National Park, Madhya Pradesh). Large herbivores, including Asian elephants, Indian rhinoceros, gaur and banteng are also a potential danger, due to their massive sizes, quick tempers and natural disdain for any predatory animal, despite the fact that their young may be preyed upon by dholes occasionally.
