= Wild Dog Diaries =

- Directed by: Senani Hegde
- Written by: N Bhanutej
- Produced by: Krupakar Senani Features Limited for National Geographic Channel
- Narrated by: Christopher Hooke
- Edited by: Saravanakumar; Ecotone
- Music by: Ravish K P
- Release date: 2006
- Running time: 47 minutes
- Country: India
- Language: English

Wild Dog Diaries is a wildlife film portraying the behaviour of wild dogs (Cuon alpinus). The film was directed by the photographer duo of Krupakar-Senani and mainly filmed in the Bandipur National Park and the Mudumalai National Park of India.

== Premise ==
The film centres around a pack of dholes, canids native to Central and Southeast Asia. The dhole is a highly social animal, living in large clans without rigid dominance hierarchies. Such clans usually consist of 12 individuals, but groups of over 40 are known. It is a diurnal pack hunter which preferentially targets medium and large sized ungulates. It is listed as Endangered by the IUCN, on account of its decreasing population, which is now estimated at less than 2,500 adults. Factors contributing to this decline include habitat loss, loss of prey, competition with other species, persecution, and disease transfer from domestic dogs.

== Production ==
The film was produced for the National Geographic Channel and completed in the year 2006. It was shot over a period of 12 years . The shooting of the film was a difficult task because of the elusive nature of the dhole and the forest terrain. While shooting for this film, Krupakar-Senani were kidnapped and held captive by the forest brigand, Veerappan.

== Story line ==
The film uncovers the life of Krupakar, a film maker who wants to make a film on dhole, but is abandoning the venture because of its elusive behaviour. He encounters a local tribesman, who gives insights on how to track the animal. The pack hunts together and various instances where they co-ordinate to kill a prey is shown. The meat that the adult dogs eat is regurgitated and the bones separated which is offered to the smaller pups as their meal. The film also shows how the adults protect the pups. Two female dogs which have strayed from another pack try to join this pack. The female leader of the pack, sensing that she might lose out on the male dogs in her pack, tries to prevent them from joining the pack. But the newcomers manage to lure away some males from the pack and start their own.

== Awards ==
The film won the Festival Grand Award 2007 in the Japanese Wildlife Film Festival held in Toyama, Japan where it beat 320 other entries to win it. It also won the Best Film award in the environment film festival, Vatavaran 2007 held in New Delhi. The film won the best documentary film award in Asian television awards, Singapore 2007
