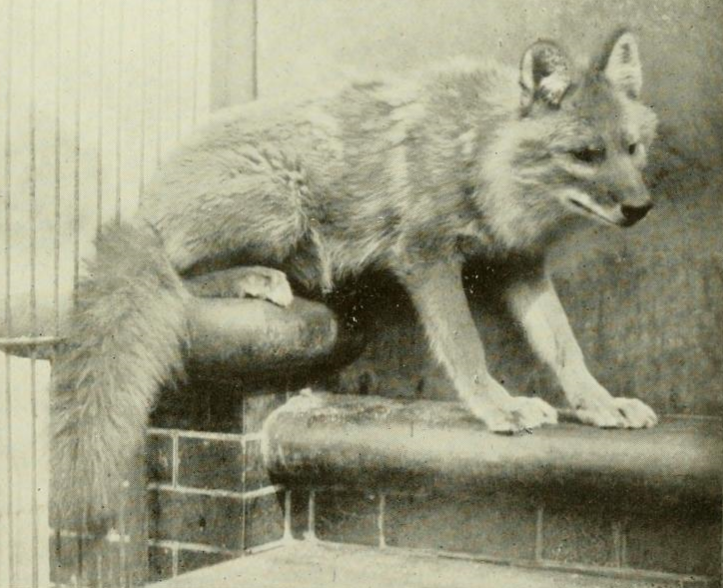
- Photographed by William Percival Westell (1910)

Conservation status
- Extinct (1946)

Scientific classification
- Kingdom: Animalia
- Phylum: Chordata
- Class: Mammalia
- Order: Carnivora
- Family: Canidae
- Genus: Cuon
- Species: C. alpinus
- Subspecies: †C. a. hesperius

Trinomial name
- †Cuon alpinus hesperius Afanasjev and Zolotarev, 1935

Synonyms
- Cuon alpinus jason (Pocock, 1936)

= Tien Shan dhole =

Tian Shan dhole

Subspecies of carnivore

The Tian Shan dhole (Cuon alpinus hesperius), also known as the Siberian dhole, Western Asiatic dhole, or northern dhole is an extinct subspecies of dhole native to the Altai and Tian Shan mountain ranges, and possibly Pamir. Only 15 records of captured and killed specimens are known, and it most likely went extinct since 1946.

== Characteristic ==
Exhibit of Tian Shan dhole.

The Tian Shan dhole is somewhat smaller than the Ussuri dhole, with a relatively wider skull and much lighter, straw-coloured winter fur coat. It has a short, wide face and a skull measuring 180 mm long on average. The top of the head and outer sides of the ears are reddish-straw coloured. The upper surface of the neck is dirty-white, with a narrow, sandy-yellow-coloured band running along the upper surface of the back from the ears to the shoulders. The outer surfaces of the limbs are sandy-yellow, while the flanks and inner sides of the limbs have little to no yellowish tint.

The auditory bullae of this subspecies has distinct morphology compared to other dhole subspecies.

== Distribution and habitat ==
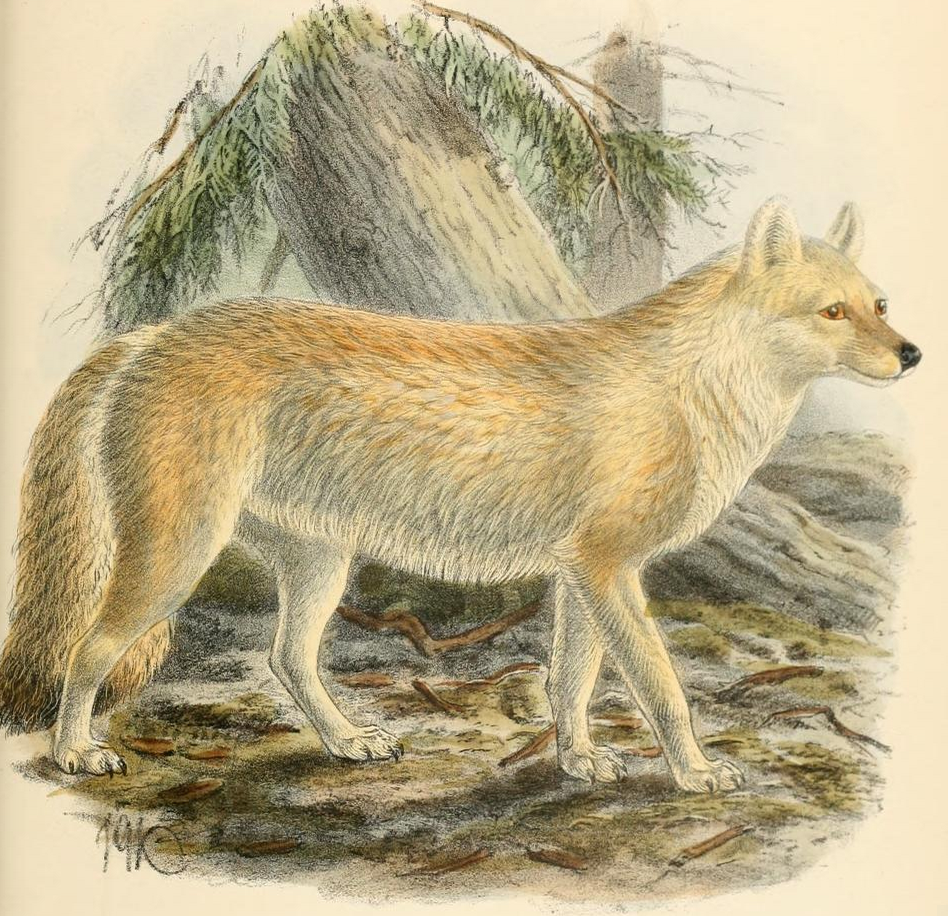
Illustration by John Gerrard Keulemans (1890).

The Tian Shan dhole's habitats consists of mountain ranges and other areas with colder climate. It lived in the Tian Shan and the Altai Mountains, and possibly in the Pamir. Their recorded range outside the USSR is considered questionable, with records from China and Mongolia requiring genetic research.

The International Union for Conservation of Nature considered the subspecies in Tian Shan, Altai and Pamir mountain ranges as extinct. Given that there has been no reliable evidence of its existence since 1946, this subspecies has been thought to be extinct since 2018, though a review of its distribution recommended additional research in Western Tian Shan.

== Hunting and diet ==
It fed primarily on Siberian ibexes, arkhar, argali, roe deer, maral and wild boar, as well as musk deer and reindeer.
