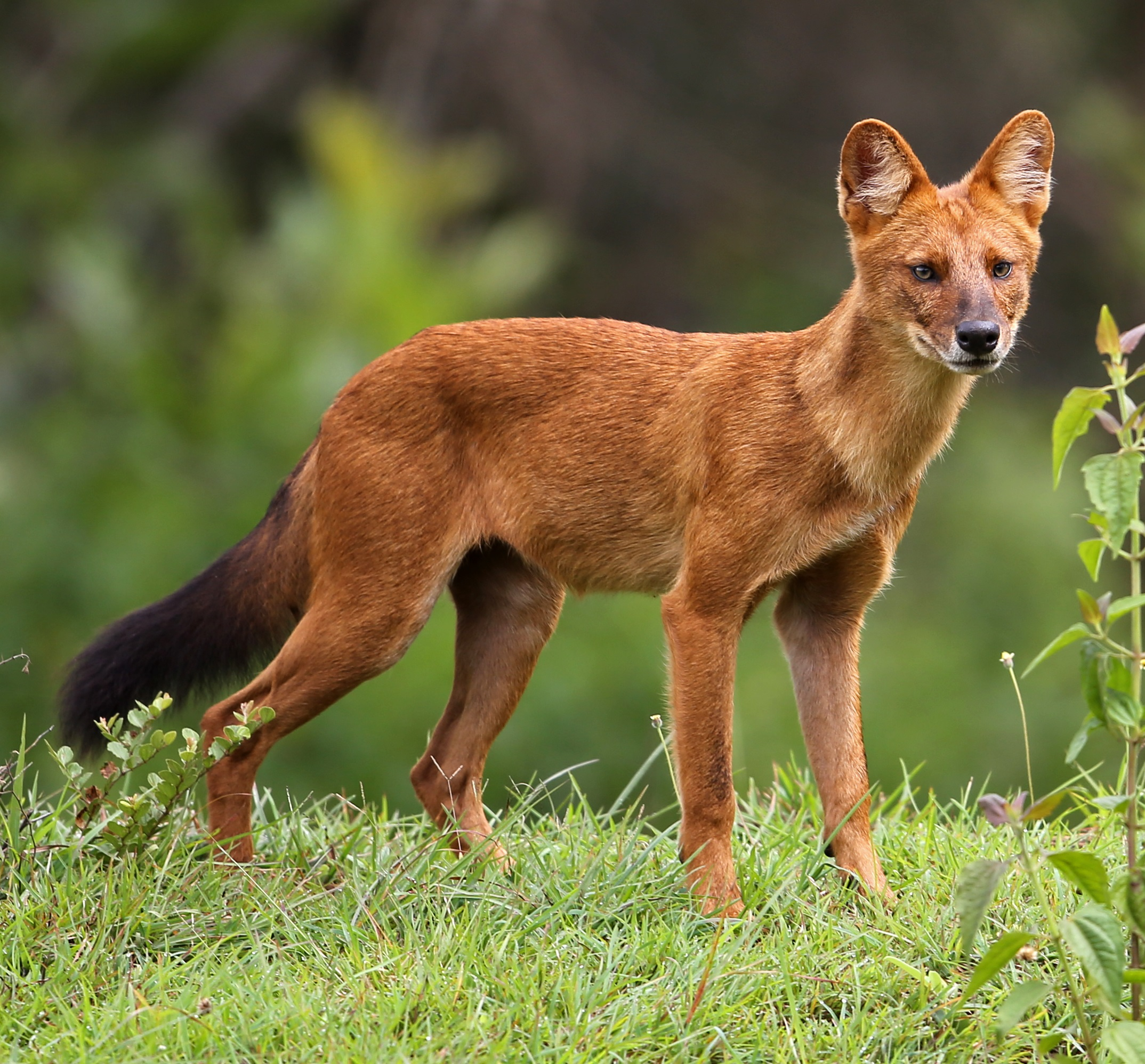

Conservation status
- Endangered (IUCN 3.1)
- CITES Appendix II

Scientific classification
- Kingdom: Animalia
- Phylum: Chordata
- Class: Mammalia
- Order: Carnivora
- Family: Canidae
- Subfamily: Caninae
- Tribe: Canini
- Genus: Cuon; Hodgson, 1838
- Species: C. alpinus

Binomial name
- Cuon alpinus (Pallas, 1811)

Subspecies
- C. a. adjustus; C. a. alpinus; C. a. fumosus; † C. a. hesperius; C. a. laniger; C. a. lepturus; C. a. sumatrensis; † C. a. antiquus; † C. a. caucasicus; † C. a. europaeus
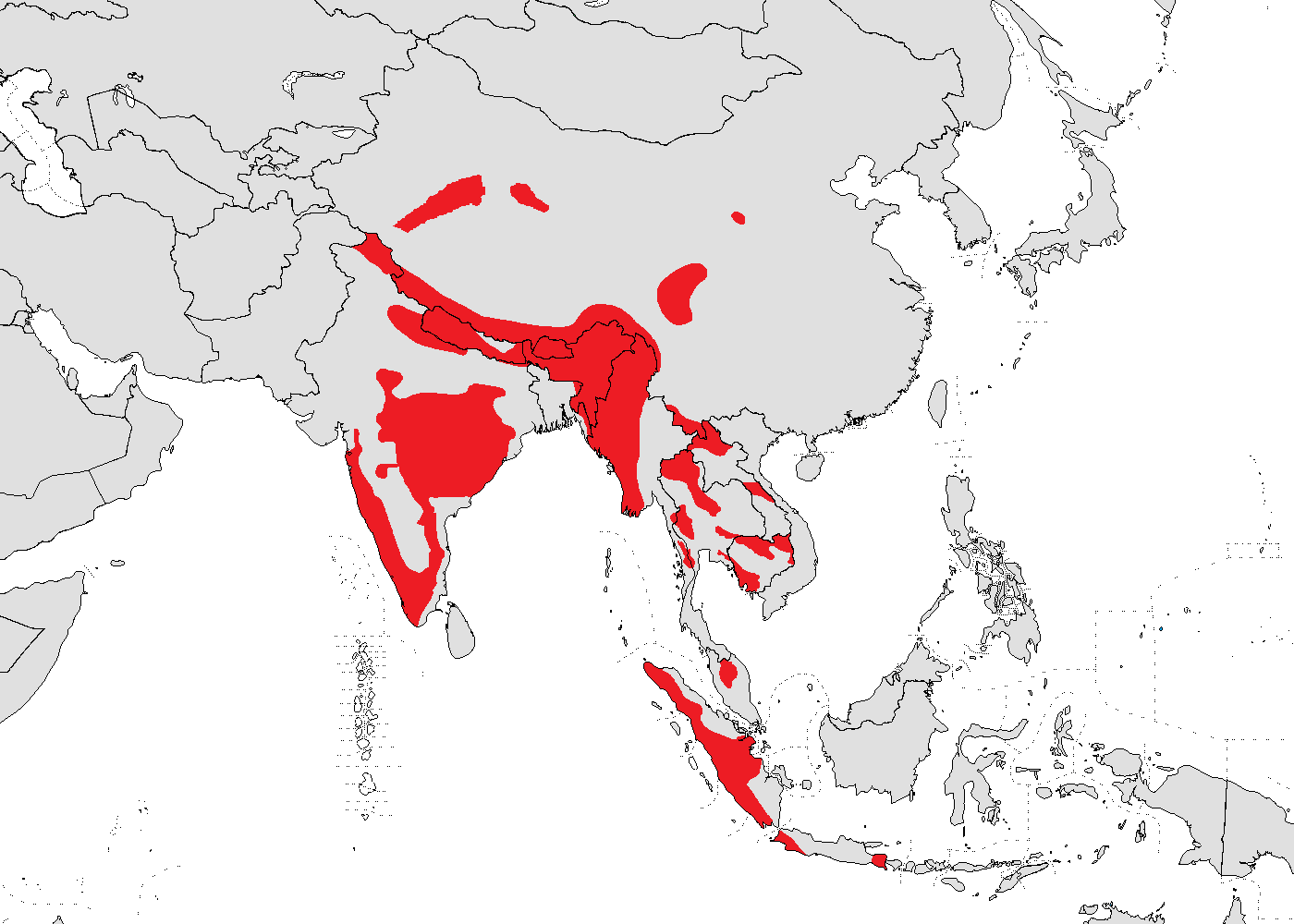
- dhole range

Synonyms
- Canis alpinus

= Dhole =

Dhole Temporal range: Middle Pleistocene – Recent 0.78–0 Ma

Species of mammal

The dhole (/doʊl/ dohl; Cuon alpinus) is a canid native to South, East and Southeast Asia. The sole member of the genus Cuon, it is anatomically distinguished from members of the genus Canis in several aspects: its skull is convex rather than concave in profile, it lacks a third lower molar, and the upper molars possess only a single cusp as opposed to between two and four. During the Pleistocene, the dhole ranged throughout Asia, with its range also extending into Europe (with a single putative, controversial record also reported from North America) but became restricted to its historical range 12,000–18,000 years ago. It is now extinct in Central Asia, parts of Southeast Asia, and possibly the Korean Peninsula and Russia.

The dhole is a highly social animal, living in large clans without rigid dominance hierarchies and containing multiple breeding females. Such clans usually consist of about 12 individuals, but groups of over 40 are known. It is a diurnal pack hunter which preferentially targets large and medium-sized ungulates. In tropical forests, the dhole competes with the tiger (Panthera tigris) and the leopard (Panthera pardus), targeting somewhat different prey species, but still with substantial dietary overlap.

It is listed as Endangered on the IUCN Red List, as populations are decreasing and estimated to comprise fewer than 2,500 mature individuals. Factors contributing to this decline include habitat loss, loss of prey, competition with other species, persecution due to livestock predation, and disease transfer from domestic dogs.

== Etymology and naming ==
The etymology of "dhole" is unclear. The possible earliest written use of the word in English occurred in 1808 by soldier Thomas Williamson, who encountered the animal in Ramghur district, India. He stated that dhole was a common local name for the species. In 1827, Charles Hamilton Smith claimed that it was derived from a language spoken in 'various parts of the East'.

Two years later, Smith connected this word with Turkish: deli 'mad, crazy', and erroneously compared the Turkish word with Old Saxon: dol and Dutch: dol (cfr. also English: dull; German: toll), which are in fact from the Proto-Germanic *dwalaz 'foolish, stupid'. Richard Lydekker wrote nearly 80 years later that the word was not used by the natives living within the species' range. The Merriam-Webster Dictionary theorises that it may have come from the Kannada: ತೋಳ, romanized: tōḷa, lit. 'wolf'.

Other English names for the species include Asian wild dog, Asiatic wild dog, Indian wild dog, whistling dog, red dog, and red wolf.

== Taxonomy and evolution ==
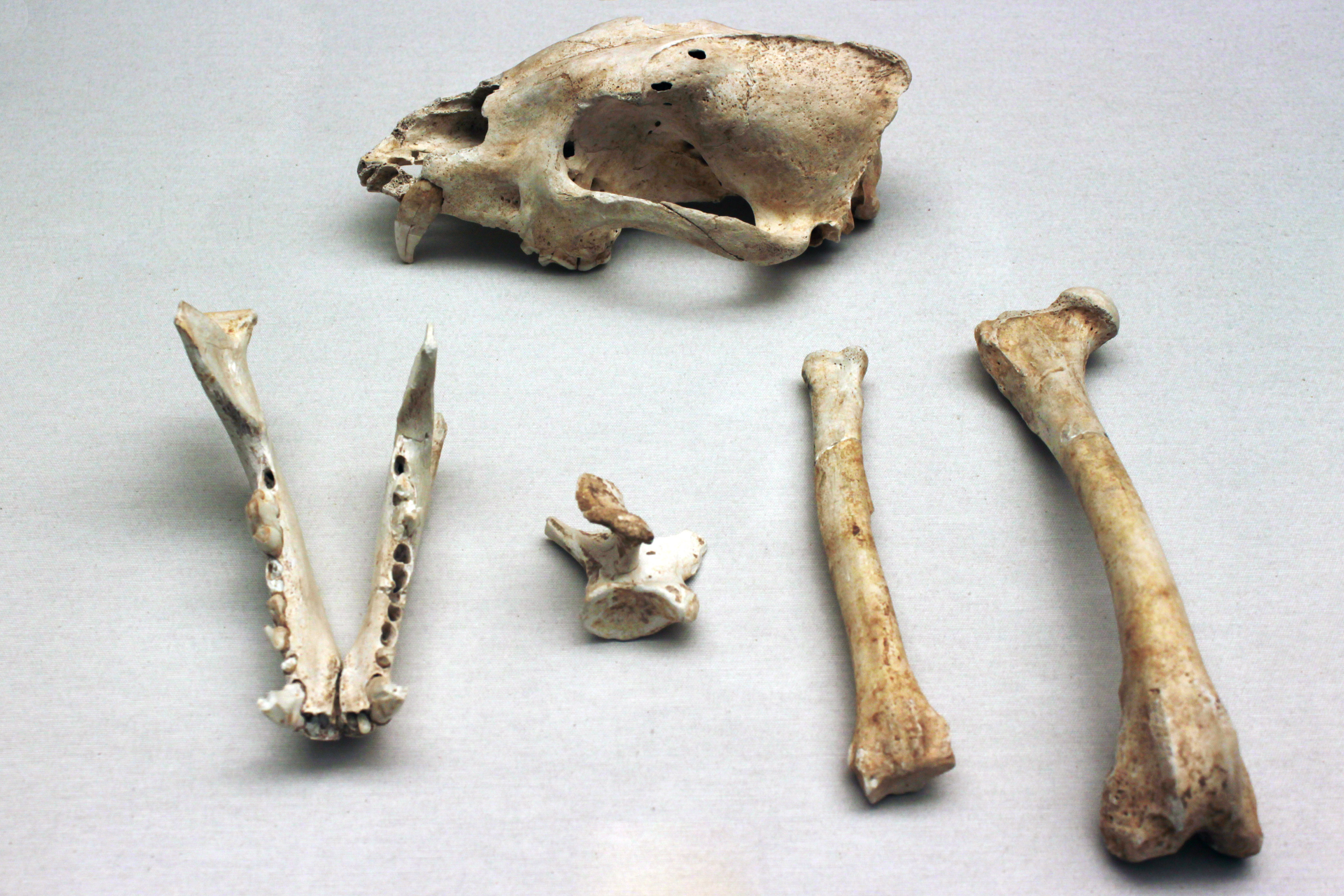
Skeletal remains of a European dhole dating back to the upper Würm period from Cova Negra de Xàtiva, Valencia, Spain

Canis alpinus was the binomial name proposed by Peter Simon Pallas in 1811, who described its range as encompassing the upper levels of Udskoi Ostrog in Amurland, towards the eastern side and in the region of the upper Lena River, around the Yenisei River and occasionally crossing into China. This northern Russian range reported by Pallas during the 18th and 19th centuries is "considerably north" of where this species occurs today.

Canis primaevus was a name proposed by Brian Houghton Hodgson in 1833 who thought that the dhole was a primitive Canis form and the progenitor of the domestic dog. Hodgson later took note of the dhole's physical distinctiveness from the genus Canis and proposed the genus Cuon.

The first study on the origins of the species was conducted by paleontologist Erich Thenius, who concluded in 1955 that the dhole was a post-Pleistocene descendant of a golden jackal-like ancestor. The paleontologist Bjorn Kurten wrote in his 1968 book Pleistocene Mammals of Europe that the primitive dhole Canis majori Del Campana 1913 —the remains of which have been found in Villafranchian era Valdarno, Italy and in China—was almost indistinguishable from the genus Canis. In comparison, the modern species has greatly reduced molars and the cusps have developed into sharply trenchant points. During the Early Middle Pleistocene there arose both Canis majori stehlini that was the size of a large wolf, and the early dhole Canis alpinus Pallas 1811 which first appeared at Hundsheim and Mosbach in Germany. In the Late Pleistocene era the European dhole (C. a. europaeus) was modern-looking and the transformation of the lower molar into a single cusped, slicing tooth had been completed; however, its size was comparable with that of a wolf. This subspecies became extinct in Europe at the end of the late Würm period, but the species as a whole still inhabits a large area of Asia. The European dhole may have survived up until the early Holocene in the Iberian Peninsula, and what is believed to be dhole remains have been found at Riparo Fredian in northern Italy dated 10,800 years old.

The vast Pleistocene range of this species also included numerous islands in Asia that this species no longer inhabits, such as Sri Lanka, Borneo and possibly Palawan in the Philippines. Middle Pleistocene dhole fossils have also been found in the Matsukae Cave in northern Kyushu Island in western Japan and in the Lower Kuzuu fauna in Tochigi Prefecture in Honshu Island, east Japan. Dhole fossils from the Late Pleistocene dated to about 10,700 years before present are known from the Luobi Cave or Luobi-Dong cave in Hainan Island in south China where they no longer exist. Additionally, fossils of canidae possibly belonging to dhole have been excavated from Dajia River in Taichung County, Taiwan.

A single record of the dhole is known from North America. This consists of a jaw fragment and teeth of Late Pleistocene age found in San Josecito Cave in northeast Mexico, dating to around 27,000–11,000 years ago. Other researchers have either considered this record as "insufficient" or suggested that further corroboration is required for the definitive taxonomic attribution of these specimens.

Dholes are also known from the Middle and Late Pleistocene fossil record of Europe. In 2021, the analyses of the mitochondrial genomes extracted from the fossil remains of two extinct European dhole specimens from the Jáchymka cave, Czech Republic dated 35,000–45,000 years old indicate that these were genetically basal to modern dholes and possessed much greater genetic diversity.

The dhole's distinctive morphology has been a source of much confusion in determining the species' systematic position among the Canidae. George Simpson placed the dhole in the subfamily Simocyoninae alongside the African wild dog and the bush dog, on account of all three species' similar dentition. Subsequent authors, including Juliet Clutton-Brock, noted greater morphological similarities to canids of the genera Canis, Dusicyon and Alopex than to either Speothos or Lycaon, with any resemblance to the latter two being due to convergent evolution.

Some authors consider the extinct Canis subgenus Xenocyon as ancestral to both the genus Lycaon and the genus Cuon. Subsequent studies on the canid genome revealed that the dhole and African wild dog are closely related to members of the genus Canis and that Canis etruscus (the Etruscan wolf) and Canis mosbachensis, ancestors of the grey wolf, are also ancestors of dholes and African wild dogs. This closeness to Canis may have been confirmed in a menagerie in Madras, where according to zoologist Reginald Innes Pocock there is a record of a dhole that interbred with a golden jackal. DNA sequencing of the Sardinian dhole (Cynotherium sardous) an extinct small canine species formerly native to the island of Sardinia in the Mediterranean, and which has often been suggested to have descended from Xenocyon, has found that it is most closely related to the living dhole among canines.

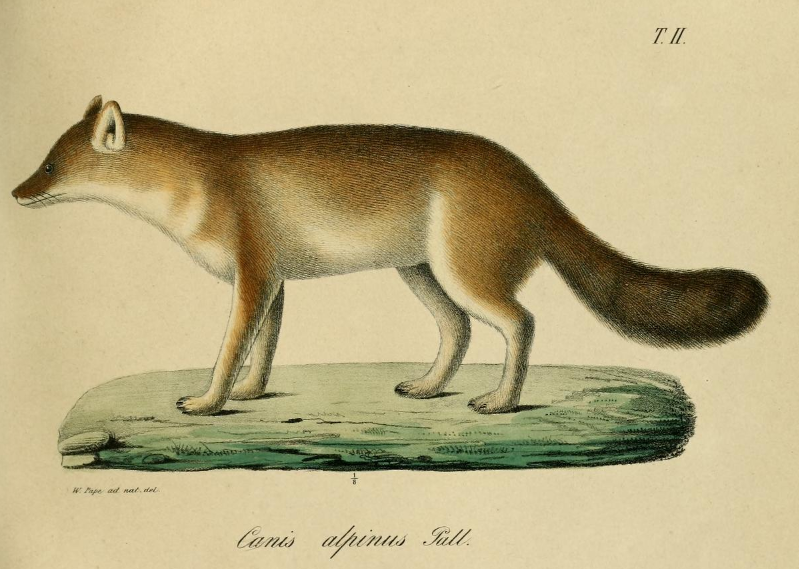
Illustration (1859) by Leopold von Schrenck, one of the first accurate depictions of the species, based on a single skin purchased in the village of Dshare on the Amur

Phylogenetic tree of the wolf-like canids with timing in millions of years (Note: For a full set of supporting references refer to the note (a) in the phylotree at Evolution of the wolf#Wolf-like canids)
- Caninae 3.5 Ma
  - 3.0
    - 2.5
      - 2.0
        - 0.96
          - 0.6
            - 0.38
              - - - Domestic dog
                  - Gray wolf
              - Coyote
            - African wolf
          - Golden jackal
        - Ethiopian wolf
      - Dhole
    - African wild dog
  - - 2.6
      - Side-striped jackal
      - Black-backed jackal

=== Admixture with the African wild dog ===
In 2018, whole genome sequencing was used to compare all members (apart from the black-backed and side-striped jackals) of the genus Canis, along with the dhole and the African wild dog (Lycaon pictus). There was strong evidence of ancient genetic admixture between the dhole and the African wild dog. Today, their ranges are remote from each other; however, during the Pleistocene era the dhole could be found as far west as Europe. The study proposes that the dhole's distribution may have once included the Middle East, from where it may have admixed with the African wild dog in North Africa. However, there is no evidence of the dhole having existed in the Middle East nor North Africa, though the Lycaon was present in Europe during the Early Pleistocene, with its last record in the region dating to 830,000 years ago. Genetic evidence from the Sardinan dhole suggests that both Sardinian and modern dholes (which are estimated to have split from each other around 900,000 years ago) share ancestry from the Lycaon lineage, but this ancestry is significantly higher in modern dholes than in the Sardinian dhole.

=== Subspecies ===
Historically, up to ten subspecies of dholes have been recognised. As of 2005, seven subspecies are recognised.

However, studies on the dhole's mtDNA and microsatellite genotype showed no clear subspecific distinctions. Nevertheless, two major phylogeographic groupings were discovered in dholes of the Asian mainland, which likely diverged during a glaciation event. One population extends from South, Central and North India (south of the Ganges) into Myanmar, and the other extends from India north of the Ganges into northeastern India, Myanmar, Thailand and the Malaysian Peninsula. The origin of dholes in Sumatra and Java is, as of 2005, unclear, as they show greater relatedness to dholes in India, Myanmar and China rather than with those in nearby Malaysia. However, the Canid Specialist Group of the International Union for the Conservation of Nature (IUCN) states that further research is needed because all of the samples were from the southern part of this species' range and the Tien Shan subspecies has distinct morphology.

In the absence of further data, the researchers involved in the study speculated that Javan and Sumatran dholes could have been introduced to the islands by humans. Fossils of dhole from the early Middle Pleistocene have been found in Java.

Dhole subspecies
| Subspecies | Image | Trinomial authority | Description | Distribution | Synonyms |
|---|---|---|---|---|---|
| C. a. adjustus Burmese dhole, Indian dhole | | Pocock, 1941 | Reddish coat, short hair on the paws and black whiskers | Northeastern India and south of the Ganges River, northern Myanmar | antiquus (Matthew & Granger, 1923), dukhunensis (Sykes, 1831) |
| C. a. alpinus Ussuri dhole (nominate subspecies) | | Pallas, 1811 | Thick tawny red coat, greyish neck and ochre muzzle | East of the eastern Sayan Mountains, eastern Russia, northeastern Asia | – |
| C. a. fumosus | | Pocock, 1936 | Luxuriant yellowish-red coat, dark back and grey neck | Western Sichuan, China and Mongolia. Southern Myanmar, Thailand, Laos, Cambodia, Vietnam, Malaysia and Java, Indonesia | infuscus (Pocock, 1936), javanicus (Desmarest, 1820) |
| †C. a. hesperius Tien Shan dhole | | Afanasjev and Zolotarev, 1935 | Long yellow tinted coat, white underside and pale whiskers Smaller than C. a. alpinus, with wider skull and lighter-coloured winter fur. | Altai, Tian Shan and Pamir mountain ranges. Currently considered to be extinct since 1946. | jason (Pocock, 1936) |
| C. a. laniger | | Pocock, 1936 | Full, yellowish-grey coat, tail not black but same colour as body | Southern Tibet, Himalayan Nepal, Sikkim, Bhutan and Kashmir | grayiformis (Hodgson, 1863), primaevus (Hodgson, 1833) |
| C. a. lepturus | | Heude, 1892 | Uniform red coat with thick underfur | South of the Yangtze River, China | clamitans (Heude, 1892), rutilans (Müller, 1839), sumatrensis (Hodgson, 1833) |
| Sumatran dhole and Javan dhole C. a. sumatrensis | | Hardwicke, 1821 | Red coat and dark whiskers | Sumatra, Indonesia Its range is highly fragmented with multiple protected areas in Sumatra and Java. | |

== Characteristics ==
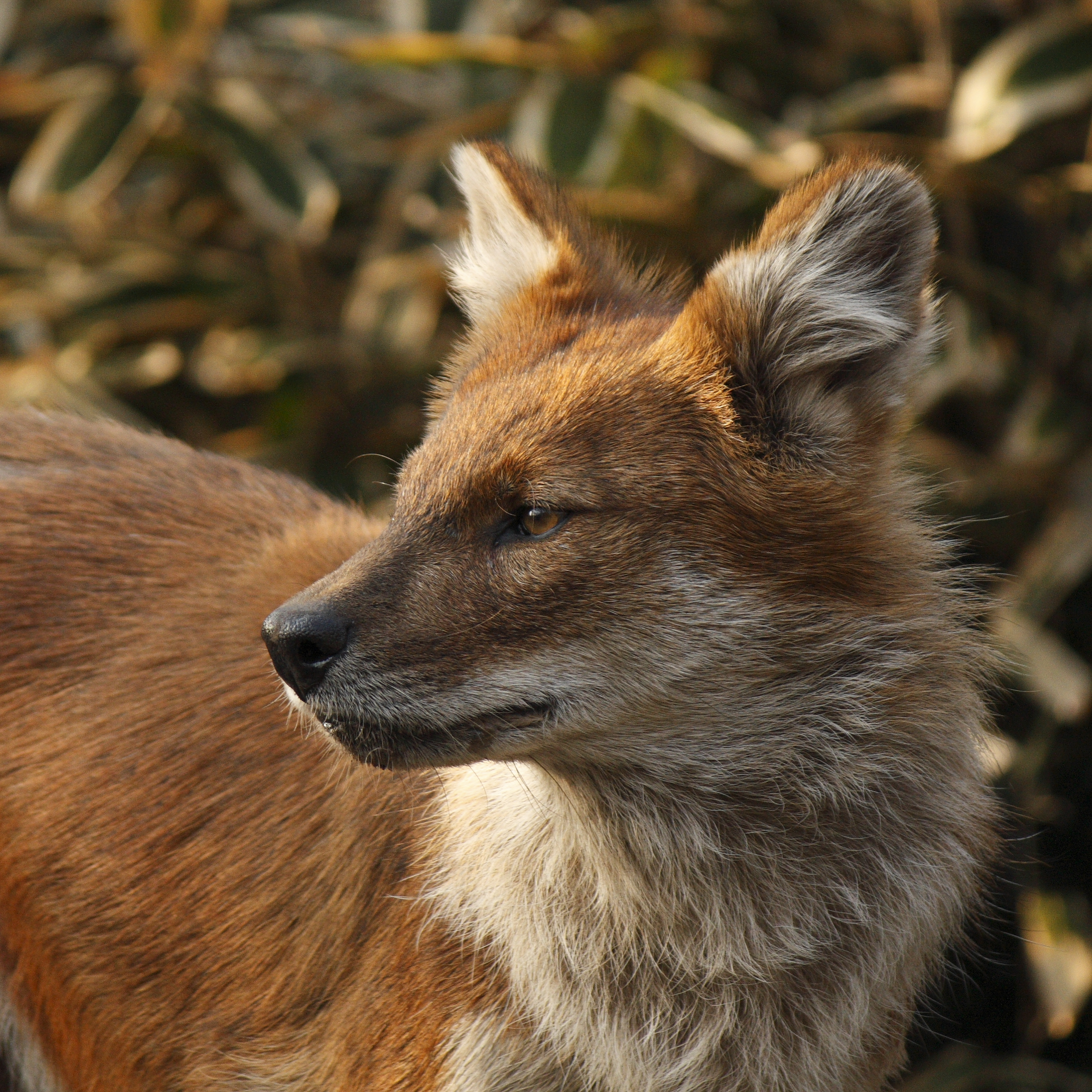
Head of a captive dhole in Ueno zoo

The general tone of the dhole's fur is reddish, with the brightest hues appearing in winter. During the winter coat phase, the back is covered in a saturated rusty-red to reddish color, featuring brownish highlights along the top of the head, neck, and shoulders. The throat, chest, flanks, belly, and upper parts of the limbs are less vividly colored, exhibiting a more yellowish tone. The lower parts of the limbs are whitish, with dark brownish bands on the anterior sides of the forelimbs. The muzzle and forehead are greyish-reddish. The tail is very luxurious and fluffy, mainly a reddish-ocher color, with a dark brown tip. The summer coat is shorter, coarser, and darker. The dorsal and lateral guard hairs in adults measure 20–30 mm (0.79–1.18 in) in length. Dholes in the Moscow Zoo moult once a year from March to May. A melanistic individual was recorded in the northern Coimbatore Forest Division in Tamil Nadu.

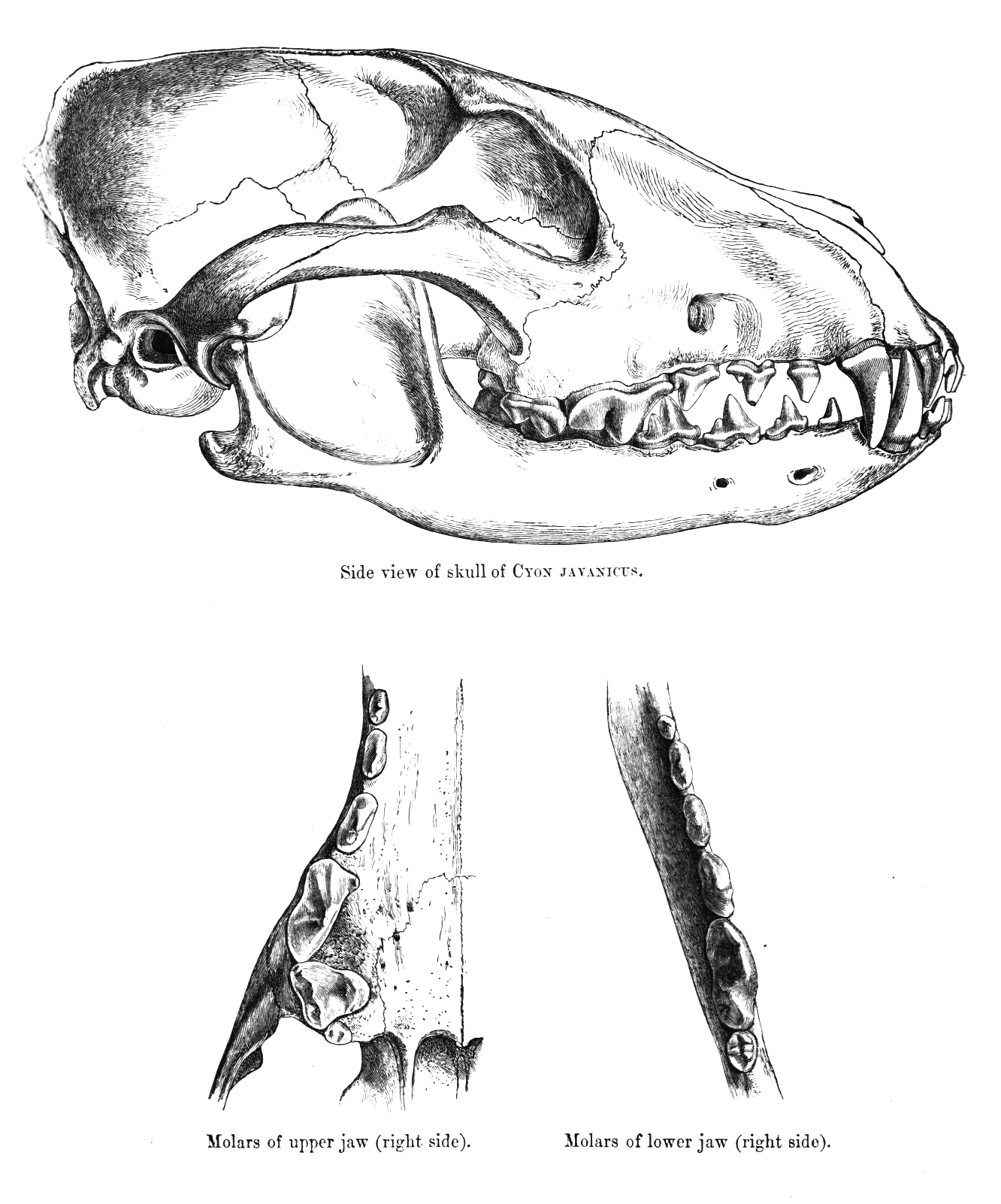
Dhole skull and molars illustrated by St. George Mivart (1890)

The dhole has a wide and massive skull with a well-developed sagittal crest, and its masseter muscles are highly developed compared to other canid species, giving the face an almost hyena-like appearance. The rostrum is shorter than that of domestic dogs and most other canids. It has six rather than seven lower cheek teeth. The upper molars are weak, being one third to one half the size of those of wolves, and with only one cusp in the internal portion, as opposed to between two and four, as is usual in canids, an adaptation thought to improve shearing ability and thus speed of prey consumption. This may allow dholes to compete more successfully with kleptoparasites. In terms of size, dholes average about 88–113 cm (35–44 in) in length (excluding a 41–50 cm (16–20 in) long tail), and stand around 42–50 cm (17–20 in) at the shoulders. Adult females can weigh 10–17 kg (22–37 lb), while the slightly larger male may weigh 15–21 kg (33–46 lb). The mean weight of adults from three small samples was 15.1 kg (33 lb).

In appearance, the dhole has been variously described as combining the physical characteristics of the gray wolf and the red fox, and as being "cat-like" on account of its long backbone and slender limbs.

== Distribution and habitat ==
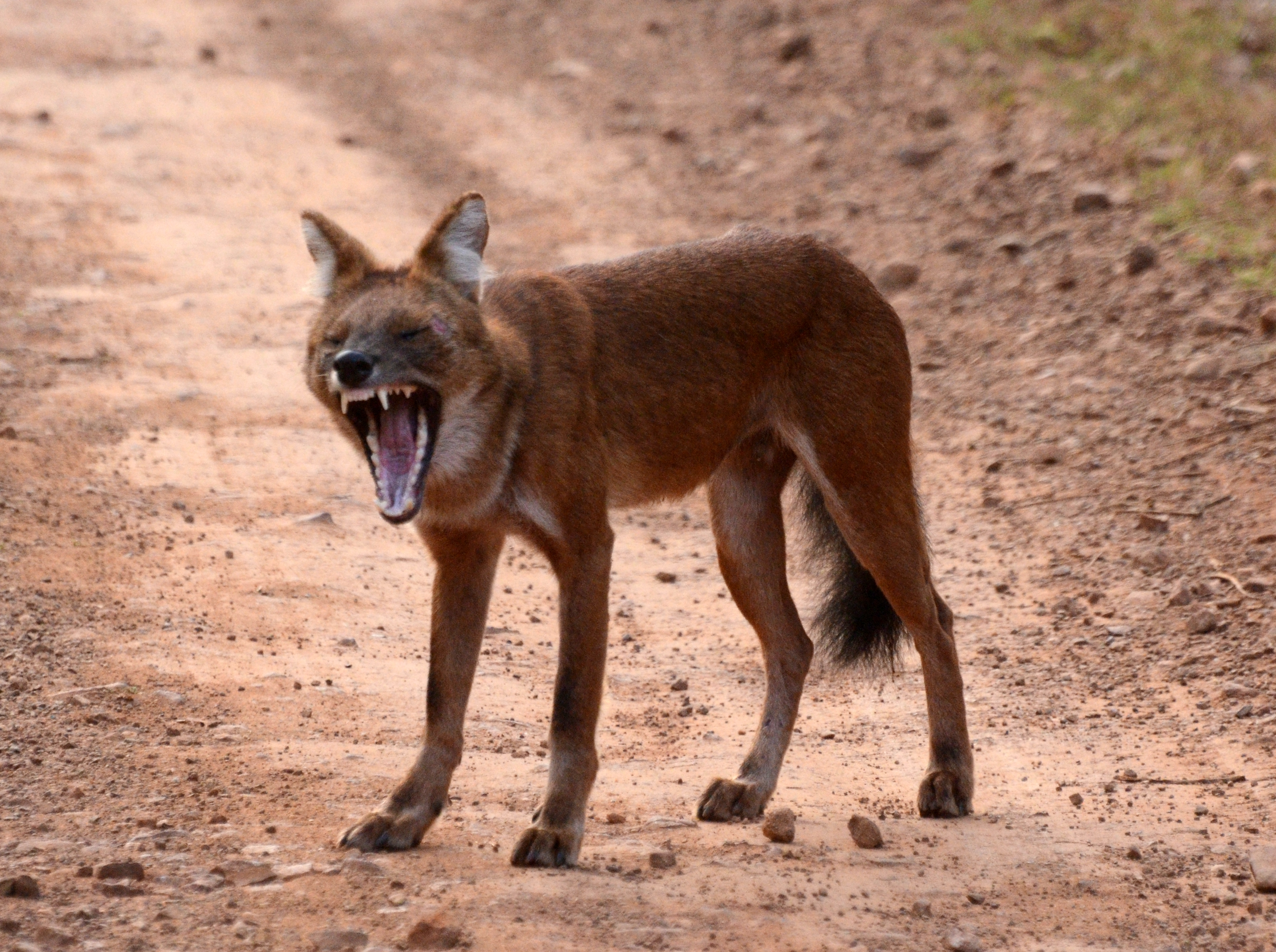
Dhole in Tadoba Andhari Tiger Reserve, Maharashtra, India

Historically, the dhole lived in Singapore and throughout Central Asia including Afghanistan, Kyrgyzstan, Kazakhstan, Mongolia, Tajikistan and Uzbekistan, though it is now considered to be extinct in these regions. Historical record in South Korea from the Veritable Records of the Joseon Dynasty also indicate that the dhole once inhabited Yangju in Gyeonggi Province, but it is now also extinct in South Korea, with the last known capture reports in 1909 and 1921 from Yeoncheon of Gyeonggi Province. The current presence of dholes in North Korea and Pakistan is considered uncertain. The dholes also once inhabited the alpine steppes extending into Kashmir to the Ladakh area, though they disappeared from 60% of their historic range in India during the past century. In India, Myanmar, Indochina, Indonesia and China, it prefers forested areas in alpine zones and is occasionally sighted in plains regions.

In the Bek-Tosot Conservancy of southern Kyrgyzstan, the possible presence of the dholes was considered likely based on genetic samples collected in 2019. This was the first record of dholes from the country in almost three decades.

The dhole might still be present in the Tunkinsky National Park in extreme southern Siberia near Lake Baikal. It possibly still lives in the Primorsky Krai province in far eastern Russia, where it was considered a rare and endangered species in 2004, with unconfirmed reports in the Pikthsa-Tigrovy Dom protected forest area; no sighting was reported in other areas since the late 1970s. Currently, no other recent reports are confirmed of dholes being present in Russia, so the IUCN considered them to be extinct in Russia. However, the dhole might be present in the eastern Sayan Mountains and in the Transbaikal region; it has been sighted in Tofalaria in the Irkutsk Oblast, the Republic of Buryatia and Zabaykalsky Krai.

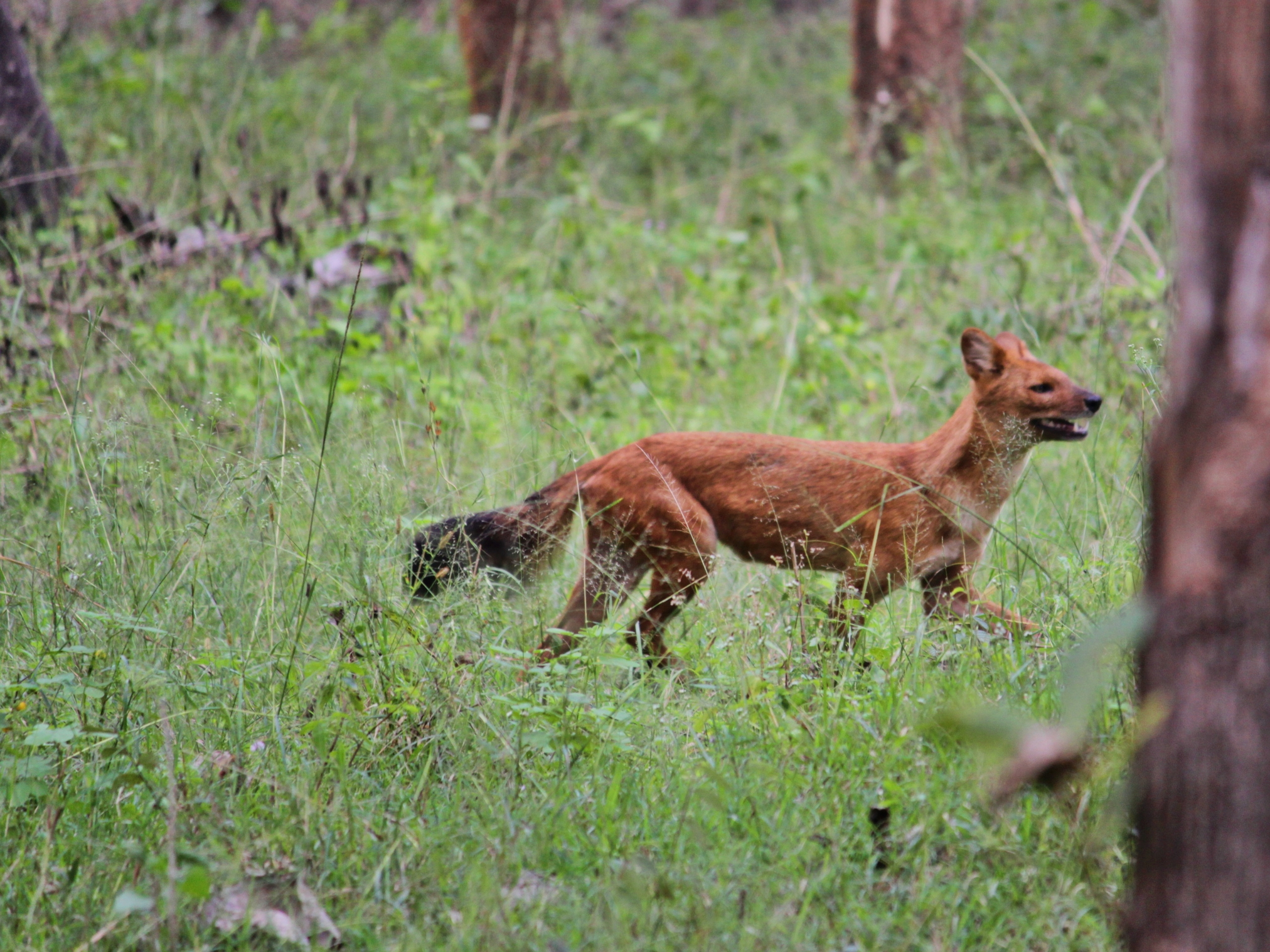
Lone dhole strolling through the jungle in Mudumalai National Park

One pack was sighted in the Qilian Mountains in China in 2006. In 2011 to 2013, local government officials and herders reported the presence of several dhole packs at elevations of 2,000 to 3,500 m (6,600 to 11,500 ft) near Taxkorgan Nature Reserve in the Xinjiang Autonomous Region. Several packs and a female adult with pups were also recorded by camera traps at elevations of around 2,500 to 4,000 m (8,200 to 13,100 ft) in Yanchiwan National Nature Reserve in the northern Gansu Province in 2013–2014. Dholes have been also reported in the Altyn-Tagh Mountains.

In China's Yunnan Province, dholes were recorded in Baima Xueshan Nature Reserve in 2010–2011. Dhole samples were obtained in Jiangxi Province in 2013. Confirmed records by camera-trapping since 2008 have occurred in southern and western Gansu province, southern Shaanxi province, southern Qinghai province, southern and western Yunnan province, western Sichuan province, the southern Xinjiang Autonomous Region and in the Southeastern Tibet Autonomous Region. There are also historical records of dhole dating to 1521–1935 in Hainan Island, but the species is no longer present and is estimated to have become extinct around 1942.

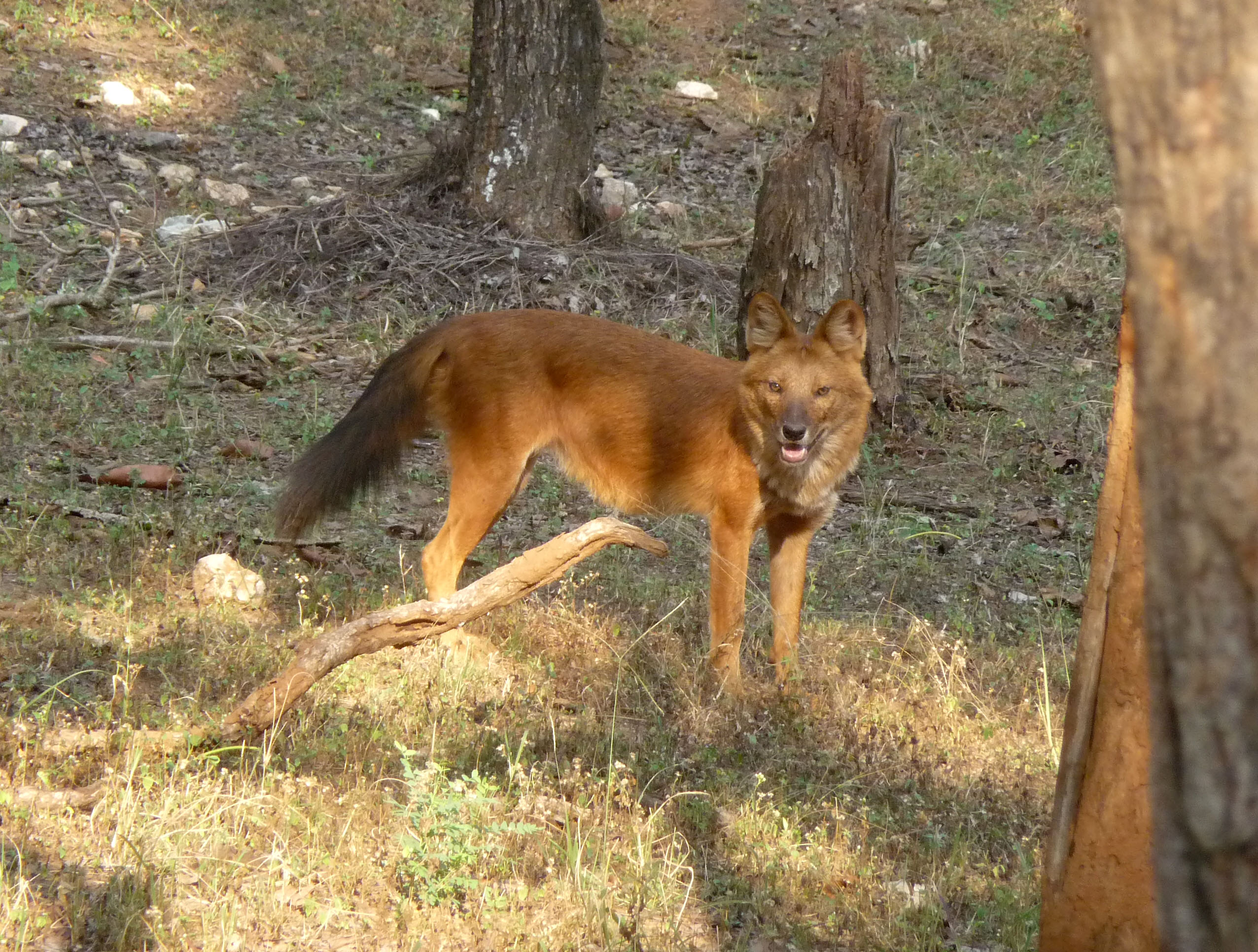
Dhole in Kanha National Park, India

The dhole occurs in most of India south of the Ganges, particularly in the Central Indian Highlands and the Western and Eastern Ghats. It is also present in Arunachal Pradesh, Assam, Meghalaya and West Bengal and in the Indo-Gangetic Plain's Terai region. Dhole populations in the Himalayas and northwest India are fragmented.

In 2011, dhole packs were recorded by camera traps in the Chitwan National Park. Its presence was confirmed in the Kanchenjunga Conservation Area in 2011 by camera traps. In February 2020, dholes were sighted in the Vansda National Park, with camera traps confirming the presence of two individuals in May of the same year. This was the first confirmed sighting of dholes in Gujarat since 1970.

In Bhutan, the dhole is present in Jigme Dorji National Park.

In Bangladesh, it inhabits forest reserves in the Sylhet area, as well the Chittagong Hill Tracts in the southeast. Recent camera trap photos in the Chittagong in 2016 showed the continued presence of the dhole. These regions probably do not harbor a viable population, as mostly small groups or solitary individuals were sighted.

In Myanmar, the dhole is present in several protected areas. In 2015, dholes and tigers were recorded by camera-traps for the first time in the hill forests of Karen State.

Its range is highly fragmented in the Malaysian Peninsula, Sumatra, Java, Vietnam and Thailand, with the Vietnamese population considered to be possibly extinct. In 2014, camera trap videos in the montane tropical forests at 2,000 m (6,600 ft) in the Kerinci Seblat National Park in Sumatra revealed its continued presence. A camera trapping survey in the Khao Ang Rue Nai Wildlife Sanctuary in Thailand from January 2008 to February 2010 documented one healthy dhole pack. In northern Laos, dholes were studied in Nam Et-Phou Louey National Protected Area. Camera trap surveys from 2012 to 2017 recorded dholes in the same Nam Et-Phou Louey National Protected Area. In Vietnam, dholes were sighted only in Pu Mat National Park in 1999, in Yok Don National Park in 2003 and 2004; and in Ninh Thuan Province in 2014.

A disjunct dhole population was reported in the area of Trabzon and Rize in northeastern Turkey near the border with Georgia in the 1990s. This report was not considered to be reliable. One single individual was claimed to have been shot in 2013 in the nearby Kabardino-Balkaria Republic of Russia in the central Caucasus; its remains were analysed in May 2015 by a biologist from the Kabardino-Balkarian State University, who concluded that the skull was indeed that of a dhole. In August 2015, researchers from the National Museum of Natural History and the Karadeniz Technical University started an expedition to track and document possible Turkish population of dhole. In October 2015, they concluded that two skins of alleged dholes in Turkey probably belonged to dogs, pending DNA analysis of samples from the skins, and, having analysed photos of the skull of alleged dhole in Kabardino-Balkaria Republic of Russia, they concluded it was a grey wolf.

== Ecology and behaviour ==
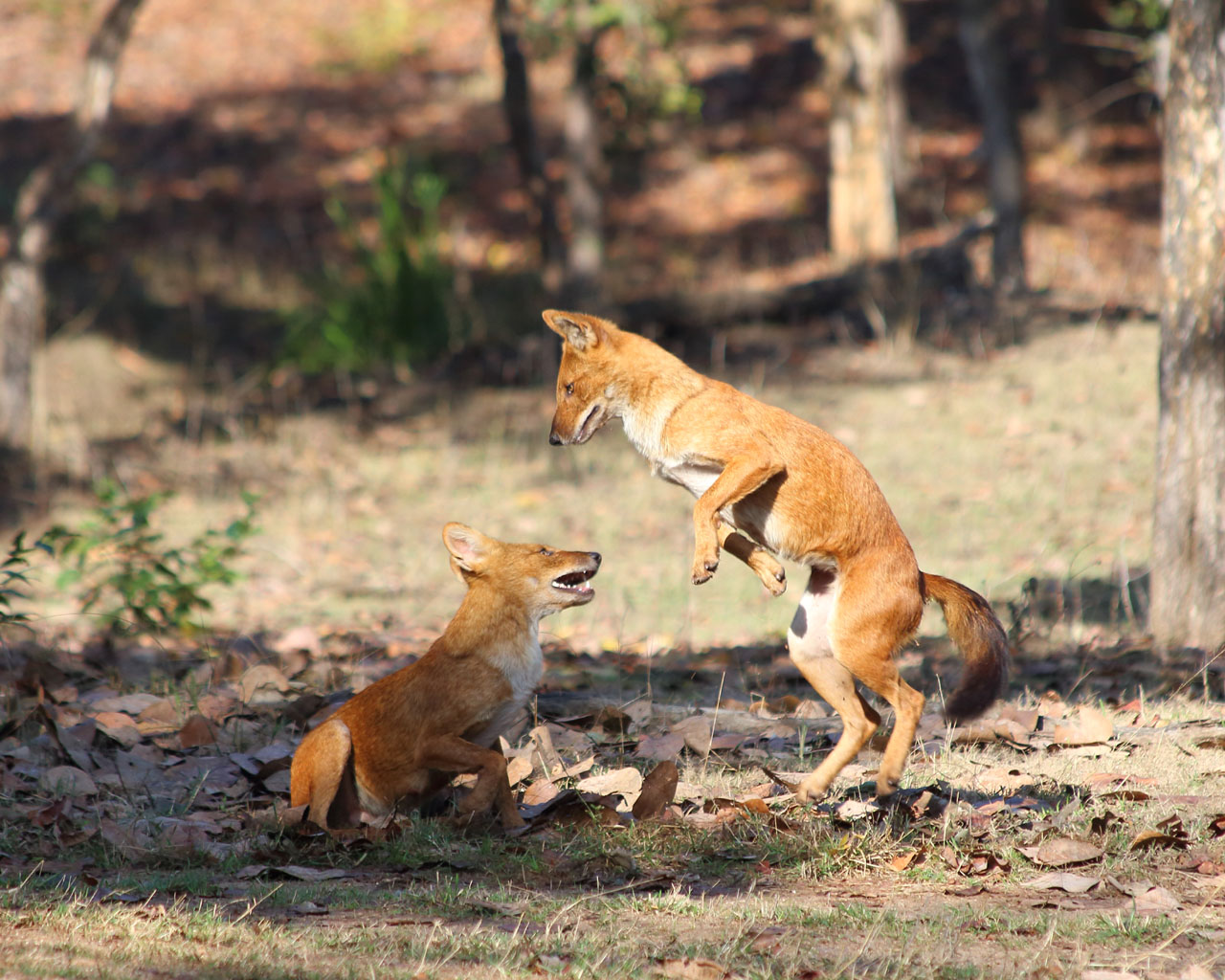
Dholes playing, Pench National Park

Dholes produce whistles resembling the calls of red foxes, sometimes rendered as coo-coo. How this sound is produced is unknown, though it is thought to help in coordinating the pack when travelling through thick brush. When attacking prey, they emit screaming KaKaKaKAA sounds. Other sounds include whines (food soliciting), growls (warning), screams, chatterings (both of which are alarm calls) and yapping cries. In contrast to wolves, dholes do not howl or bark.

Dholes have a complex body language. Friendly or submissive greetings are accompanied by horizontal lip retraction and the lowering of the tail, as well as licking. Playful dholes open their mouths with their lips retracted and their tails held in a vertical position whilst assuming a play bow. Aggressive or threatening dholes pucker their lips forward in a snarl and raise the hairs on their backs, as well as keep their tails horizontal or vertical. When afraid, they pull their lips back horizontally with their tails tucked and their ears flat against the skull.

=== Social and territorial behaviour ===
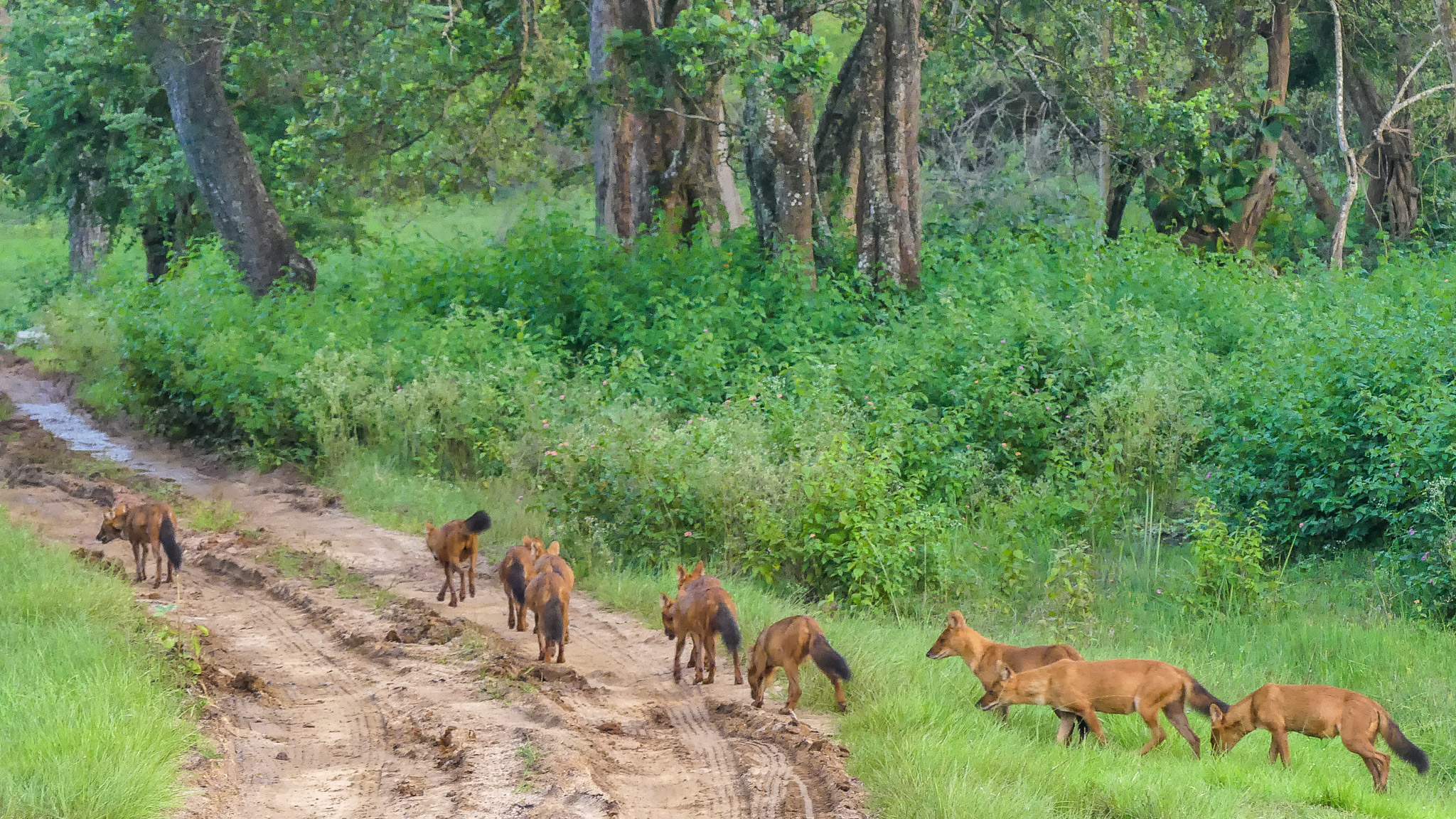
A pack of dholes

Dholes are more social than gray wolves, and have less of a dominance hierarchy, as seasonal scarcity of food is not a serious concern for them. In this manner, they closely resemble African wild dogs in social structure. They live in clans rather than packs, as the latter term refers to a group of animals that always hunt together. In contrast, dhole clans frequently break into small packs of three to five animals, particularly during the spring season, as this is the optimal number for catching fawns. Dominant dholes are hard to identify, as they do not engage in dominance displays as wolves do, though other clan members will show submissive behaviour toward them. Intragroup fighting is rarely observed.

Dholes are far less territorial than wolves, with pups from one clan often joining another without trouble once they mature sexually. Clans typically number 5 to 12 individuals in India, though clans of 40 have been reported. In Thailand, clans rarely exceed three individuals. Unlike other canids, there is no evidence of dholes using urine to mark their territories or travel routes. When urinating, dholes, especially males, may raise one hind leg or both to result in a handstand. Handstand urination is also seen in bush dogs (Speothos venaticus) and domestic dogs. They may defecate in conspicuous places, though a territorial function is unlikely, as faeces are mostly deposited within the clan's territory rather than the periphery. Faeces are often deposited in what appear to be communal latrines. They do not scrape the earth with their feet, as other canids do, to mark their territories.

=== Denning ===
Four kinds of den have been described; simple earth dens with one entrance (usually remodeled striped hyena or porcupine dens); complex cavernous earth dens with more than one entrance; simple cavernous dens excavated under or between rocks; and complex cavernous dens with several other dens in the vicinity, some of which are interconnected. Dens are typically located under dense scrub or on the banks of dry rivers or creeks. The entrance to a dhole den can be almost vertical, with a sharp turn three to four feet down. The tunnel opens into an antechamber, from which extends more than one passage. Some dens may have up to six entrances leading up to 30 m (98 ft) of interconnecting tunnels. These "cities" may be developed over many generations of dholes, and are shared by the clan females when raising young together. Like African wild dogs and dingoes, dholes will avoid killing prey close to their dens.

=== Reproduction and development ===
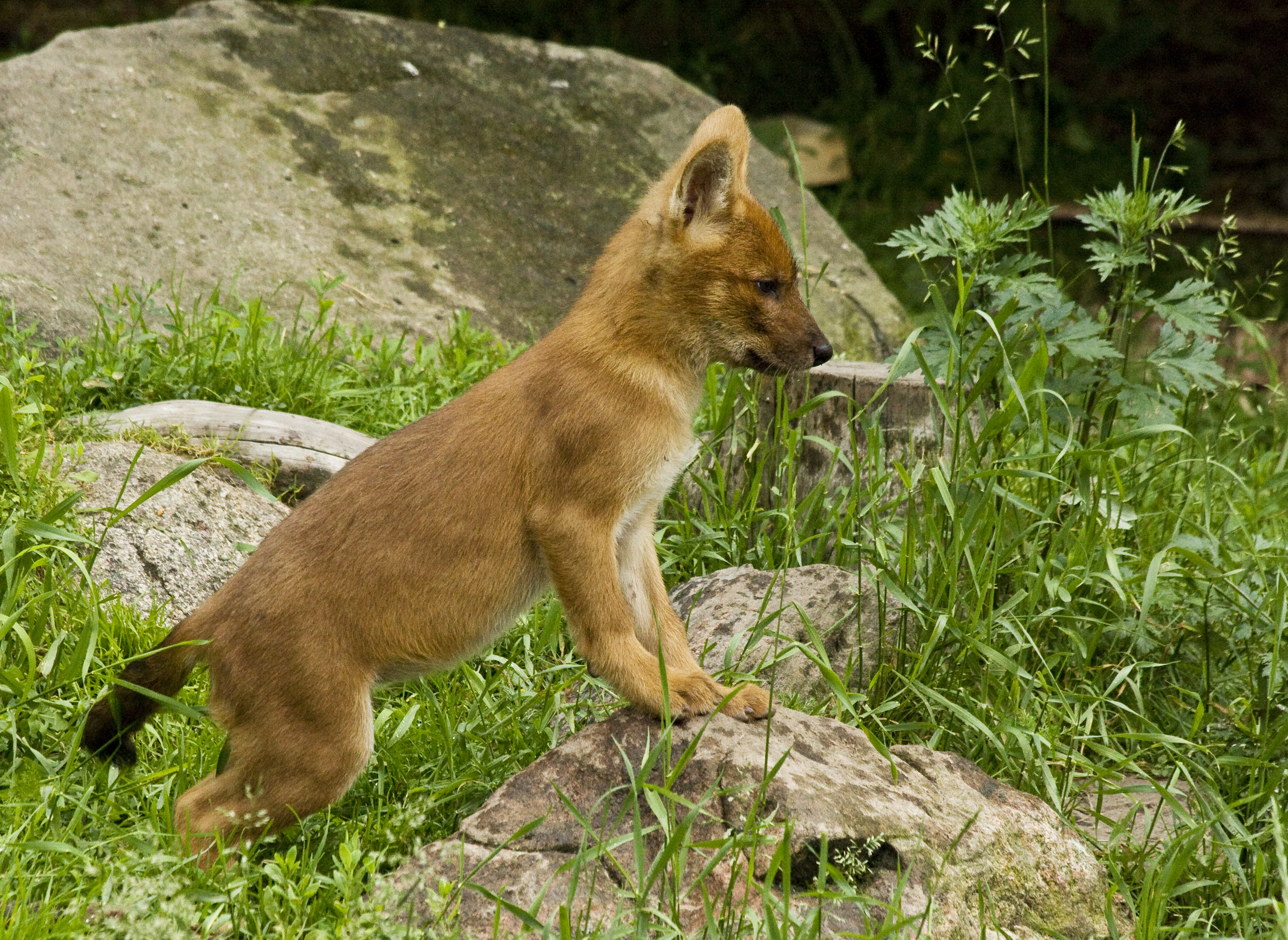
Dhole pup, Kolmården Wildlife Park

In India, the mating season occurs between mid-October and January, while captive dholes in the Moscow Zoo breed mostly in February. Unlike wolf packs, dhole clans may contain more than one breeding female. More than one female dhole may den and rear their litters together in the same den. During mating, the female assumes a crouched, cat-like position. There is no copulatory tie characteristic of other canids when the male dismounts. Instead, the pair lie on their sides facing each other in a semicircular formation. The gestation period lasts 60–63 days, with litter sizes averaging four to six pups.

The hormone metabolites of five males and three females kept in Thai zoos was studied. The breeding males showed an increased level of testosterone from October to January. The oestrogen level of captive females increases for about two weeks in January, followed by an increase of progesterone. They displayed sexual behaviours during the oestrogen peak of the females.

Pups are suckled at least 58 days. During this time, the pack feeds the mother at the den site. Dholes do not use rendezvous sites to meet their pups as wolves do, though one or more adults will stay with the pups at the den while the rest of the pack hunts. Once weaning begins, the adults of the clan will regurgitate food for the pups until they are old enough to join in hunting. They remain at the den site for 70–80 days. By the age of six months, pups accompany the adults on hunts and will assist in killing large prey such as sambar by the age of eight months. Maximum longevity in captivity is 15–16 years.

=== Hunting behaviour ===
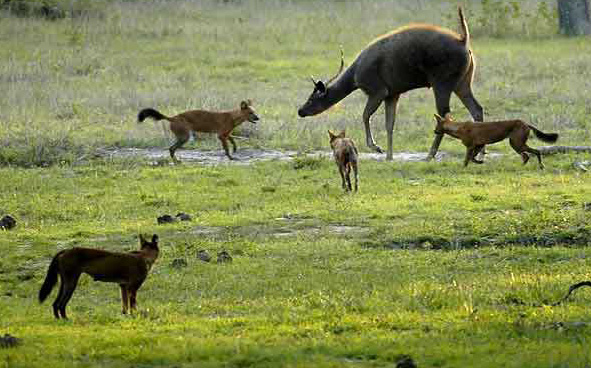
Dholes attacking a sambar (Rusa unicolor), Bandipur National Park

Before embarking on a hunt, clans go through elaborate prehunt social rituals involving nuzzling, body rubbing and mounting. Dholes are primarily diurnal hunters, hunting in the early hours of the morning. They rarely hunt at night, except on moonlit nights, indicating they greatly rely on sight when hunting. They can chase their prey for many hours. During a pursuit, one or more dholes takes over chasing the prey, while the rest of the pack keeps up at a steadier pace behind, taking over once the other group tires. Most chases are short, lasting only 500 m (1,600 ft). When chasing fleet-footed prey, they run at a pace of 50 km/h (30 mph). Dholes frequently drive their prey into water bodies, where the targeted animal's movements are hindered.

Once large prey is caught, one dhole grabs the prey's nose, while the rest of the pack pulls the animal down by the flanks and hindquarters. They do not use a killing bite to the throat. They occasionally blind their prey by attacking the eyes. Serows are among the only ungulate species capable of effectively defending themselves against dhole attacks, due to their thick, protective coats and short, sharp horns capable of easily impaling dholes. Dholes tear open their prey's flanks and disembowel it, eating the heart, liver, lungs and some sections of the intestines. The stomach and rumen are usually left untouched. Prey weighing less than 50 kg (110 lb) is usually killed within two minutes, while large stags may take 15 minutes to die. Once prey is secured, dholes tear off pieces of the carcass and eat in seclusion. They give the pups access to a kill. They are generally tolerant of scavengers at their kills. Both mother and young are provided with regurgitated food by other pack members.

=== Feeding ecology ===
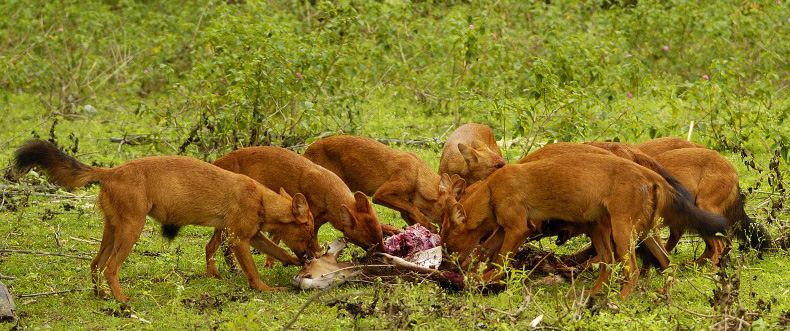
Dholes feeding on a chital, Bandipur National Park

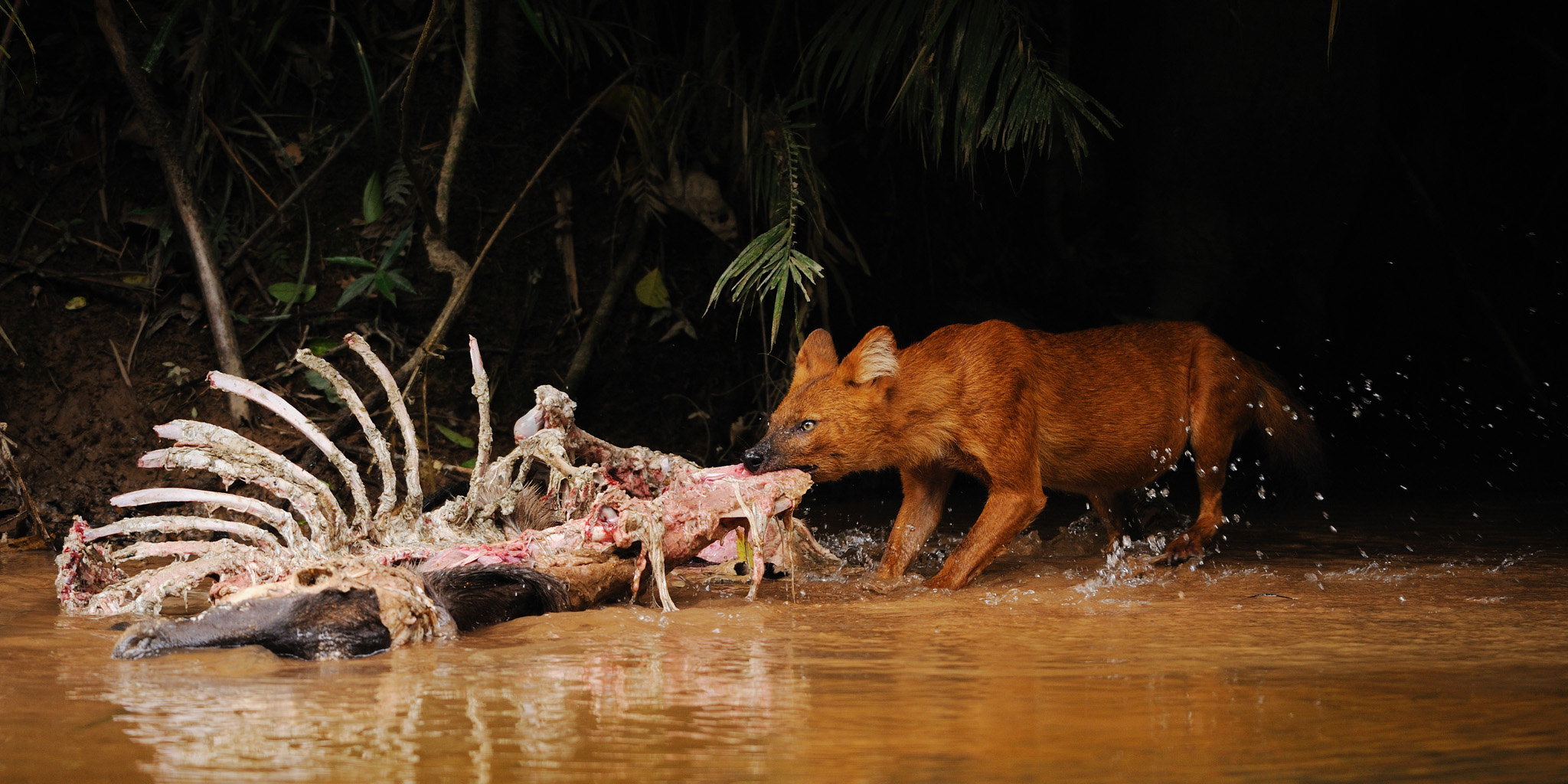
Dhole feeding on sambar deer carcass, Khao Yai National Park

Prey animals in India include chital, sambar deer, muntjac, mouse deer, barasingha, wild boar, gaur, water buffaloes, banteng, cattle, nilgai, goats, Indian hares, Himalayan field rats and langurs. There is one record of a pack bringing down an Indian elephant calf in Assam, despite desperate defense of the mother, resulting in numerous losses to the pack. In Kashmir, they prey on markhor, and thamin in Myanmar, Malayan tapir, Sumatran serow in Sumatra and the Malay Peninsula and Javan rusa in Java. In the Tian Shan and Tarbagatai Mountains, dholes prey on Siberian ibexes, arkhar, roe deer, Caspian red deer and wild boar. In the Altai and Sayan Mountains, they prey on musk deer and reindeer. In eastern Siberia, they prey on roe deer, Manchurian wapiti, wild pig, musk deer and reindeer, while in Primorye they feed on sika deer and goral. In Mongolia, they prey on argali and rarely Siberian ibex.

Like African wild dogs, but unlike wolves, dholes are not known to actively hunt people. They are known to eat insects and lizards. Dholes eat fruit and vegetable matter more readily than other canids. In captivity, they eat various kinds of grasses, herbs and leaves, seemingly for pleasure rather than just when ill. In summertime in the Tian Shan Mountains, dholes eat large quantities of mountain rhubarb. Although opportunistic, dholes have a seeming aversion to hunting cattle and their calves. Livestock predation by dholes has been a problem in Bhutan since the late 1990s, as domestic animals are often left outside to graze in the forest, sometimes for weeks at a time. Livestock stall-fed at night and grazed near homes are never attacked. Oxen are killed more often than cows, probably because they are given less protection.

=== Enemies and competitors ===
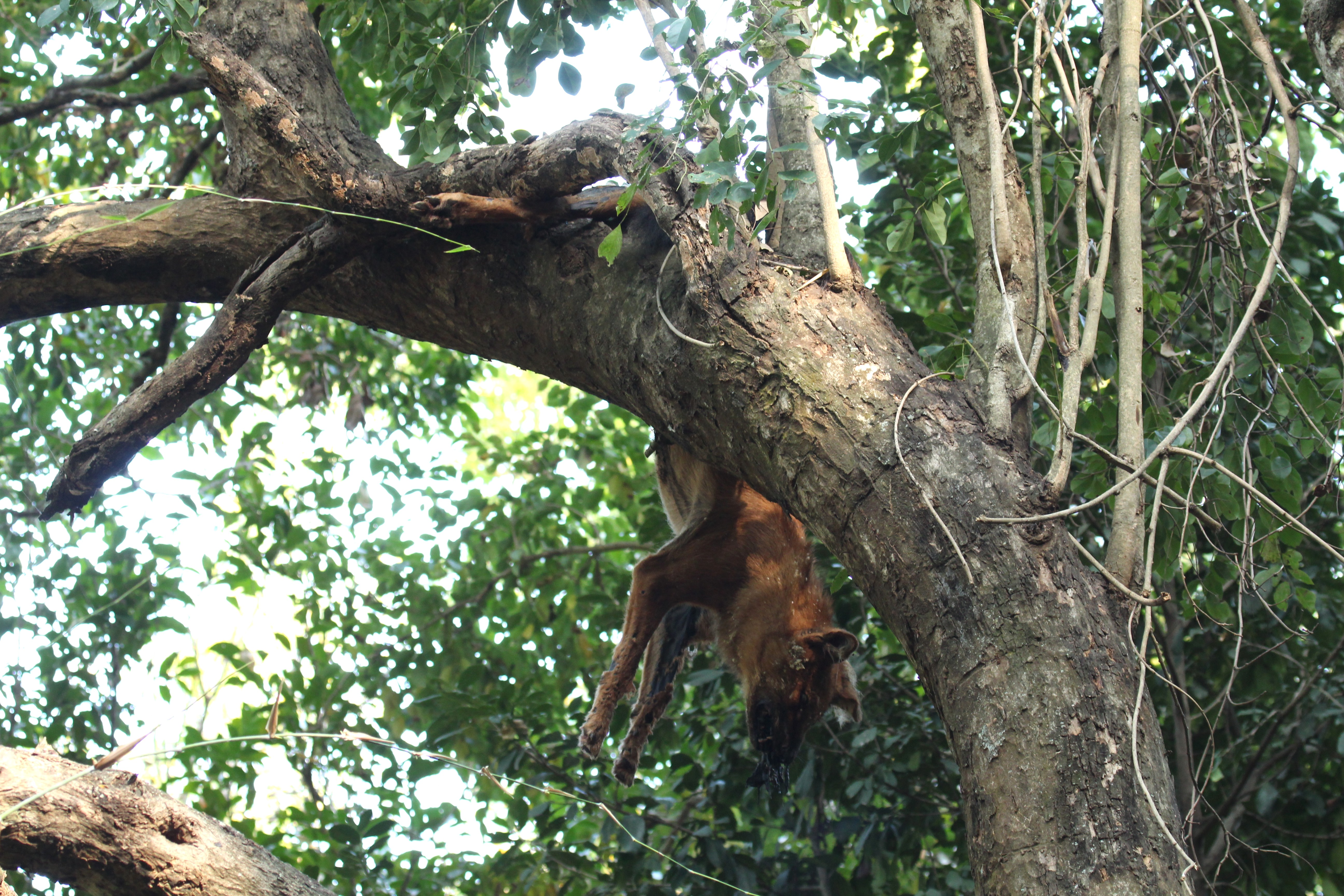
Dhole killed and cached in a tree by a leopard, India

In some areas, dholes are sympatric to tigers and leopards. Competition between these species is mostly avoided through differences in prey selection, although there is still substantial dietary overlap. Along with leopards, dholes typically target animals in the 30–175 kg (66–386 lb) range (mean weights of 35.3 kg (78 lb) for dhole and 23.4 kg (52 lb) for leopard), while tigers selected for prey animals heavier than 176 kg (388 lb) (but their mean prey weight was 65.5 kg (144 lb)). Also, other characteristics of the prey, such as sex, arboreality and aggressiveness, may play a role in prey selection. For example, dholes preferentially select male chital, whereas leopards kill both sexes more evenly (and tigers prefer larger prey altogether), dholes and tigers kill langurs rarely compared to leopards due to the leopards' greater arboreality, while leopards kill wild boar infrequently due to the inability of this relatively light predator to tackle aggressive prey of comparable weight.

Tigers are dangerous opponents for dholes, as they have sufficient strength to kill a dhole with a single paw strike. Dhole packs are smaller in areas with higher tiger densities due to tigers directly killing dholes and stealing kills they made. The kleptoparasitism causes dholes to prefer hunting smaller animals because they can eat more of a smaller carcass before a tiger arrives to steal it. Direct predation can lead to lower reproductive and recruitment rates, lower hunting success rates and less food for the pups when a helper is killed, and potentially pack destabilization if one member of the breeding pair is killed.

Dhole packs may steal leopard kills, while leopards may kill dholes if they encounter them singly or in pairs. There are numerous records of leopards being treed by dholes. Dholes were once thought to be a major factor in reducing Asiatic cheetah populations, though this is doubtful, as cheetahs live in open areas as opposed to forested areas favoured by dholes. Since leopards are smaller than tigers and are more likely to hunt dholes, dhole packs tend to react more aggressively toward them than they do towards tigers.

Dhole packs occasionally attack Asiatic black bears, snow leopards and sloth bears. When attacking bears, dholes will attempt to prevent them from seeking refuge in caves and lacerate their hindquarters. Although usually antagonistic toward wolves, they may hunt and feed alongside one another.

The dhole is also sympatric with the Indian wolf (Canis lupus pallipes) in parts of its range. There is at least one record of a lone wolf associating with a pair of dholes in Debrigarh Wildlife Sanctuary, and two observations in Satpura Tiger Reserve. They infrequently associate in mixed groups with golden jackals. Domestic dogs may kill dholes, though they will feed alongside them on occasion.

=== Diseases and parasites ===
Dholes are vulnerable to a number of different diseases, particularly in areas where they are sympatric with other canid species. Infectious pathogens such as Toxocara canis are present in their faeces. They may suffer from rabies, canine distemper, mange, trypanosomiasis, canine parvovirus and endoparasites such as cestodes and roundworms.

== Threats ==
Habitat loss is thought to amount to 60% of the dhole's historical range in India. The fragmentation and isolation of dhole populations has resulted in inbreeding and the Allee effect, which threaten its long-term viability.

Some ethnic groups like the Kuruba and Mon Khmer-speaking tribes will appropriate dhole kills; some Indian villagers welcome the dhole because of this appropriation of dhole kills. Dholes were persecuted throughout India for bounties until they were given protection by the Wildlife Protection Act of 1972. Methods used for dhole hunting included poisoning, snaring, shooting and clubbing at den sites. Native Indian people killed dholes primarily to protect livestock, while British sporthunters during the British Raj did so under the conviction that dholes were responsible for drops in game populations. Persecution of dholes still occurs with varying degrees of intensity according to the region. Bounties paid for dholes used to be 25 rupees, though this was reduced to 20 in 1926 after the number of presented dhole carcasses became too numerous to maintain the established reward. The Indochinese dhole population suffers heavily from nonselective hunting techniques such as snaring. The fur trade does not pose a significant threat to the dhole. The people of India do not eat dhole flesh and their fur is not considered overly valuable. Due to their rarity, dholes were never harvested for their skins in large numbers in the Soviet Union and were sometimes accepted as dog or wolf pelts (being labeled as "half wolf" for the latter). The winter fur was prized by the Chinese, who bought dhole pelts in Ussuriysk during the late 1860s for a few silver rubles. In the early 20th century, dhole pelts reached eight rubles in Manchuria. In Semirechye, fur coats made from dhole skin were considered the warmest, but were very costly.

== Conservation ==
In India, the dhole is protected under Schedule 2 of the Wildlife Protection Act, 1972. The creation of reserves under Project Tiger provided some protection for dhole populations sympatric with tigers. In 2014, the Indian government sanctioned its first dhole conservation breeding centre at the Indira Gandhi Zoological Park (IGZP) in Visakhapatnam. The dhole has been protected in Russia since 1974, though it is vulnerable to poison left out for wolves. In China, the animal is listed as a category II protected species under the Chinese wildlife protection act of 1988. In Cambodia, the dhole is protected from all hunting, while conservation laws in Vietnam limit extraction and utilisation.

In 2016, the Korean company Sooam Biotech was reported to be attempting to clone the dhole using dogs as surrogate mothers to help conserve the species.

== In culture and literature ==
Drawing of a dhole from the Imperial Chinese Encyclopedia

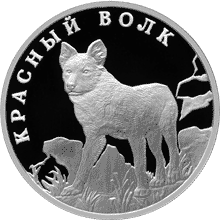
Dhole on the Russian ruble

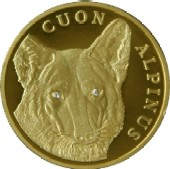
Dhole on the Kazakhstani tenge

Three dhole-like animals are featured on the coping stone of the Bharhut stupa dating 100 BC. They are shown waiting by a tree, with a woman or spirit trapped up it, a scene reminiscent of dholes treeing tigers. In Tamil Sangam literature from 100 BC to 200 AD, the dhole is a recurring character, a device of metonymy in song; Ainkurunuru 323 narrates a pregnant dhole craving to eat wild pig, so its male mate hunts for pig. A dhole may have been presented as a gift to the Akkadian king Ibbi-Sin as tribute referred to in the inscription as the "red dog of Meluhha" or Indus Valley Civilisation.

The dhole's fearsome reputation in India is reflected by the number of pejorative names it possesses in Hindi, which variously translate as "red devil", "devil dog", "jungle devil", or "hound of Kali". Dholes appeared in The Second Jungle Book in the chapter Red Dog, in which Mowgli and the Seeonee Wolf Pack must battle a pack of dholes, referred to as "red dogs" that have invaded their part of the jungle.

Leopold von Schrenck had trouble obtaining dhole specimens during his exploration of Amurland, as the local Gilyaks greatly feared the species. This fear and superstition was not shared by neighbouring Tungusic peoples. It was speculated that this differing attitude towards the dhole was due to the Tungusic peoples' more nomadic, hunter-gatherer lifestyle.

Japanese author Uchida Roan wrote about the declining popularity of indigenous dog breeds in 1901, which he asserted were descended from the dhole.

In China, the dhole was widely known throughout history and mythology. One notable legendary creature is the Nine sons of the dragon, which was thought to be a creature that was part dhole, part dragon. In modern times, the Chinese word for dhole 豺; Chái is often confused with 'jackal' or 'wolf', resulting in many confusions and mistranslations.

Amrita Mahale’s 2025 novel ‘‘Real Life’’ features dholes prominently through the character of Tara, a wildlife biologist researching dhole packs in the fictional Mahamaya Valley in the Himalayas. Her field research and observations of the species form an important part of the novel’s narrative.

=== Tameability ===
Brian Houghton Hodgson kept captured dholes in captivity, and found, with the exception of one animal, they remained shy and vicious even after 10 months. Adult dholes are nearly impossible to tame, though pups are docile and can even be allowed to play with domestic dog pups until they reach early adulthood.

== See also ==
- Wild Dog Diaries
