= Jose V. Lopez =

American-Filipino molecular biologist

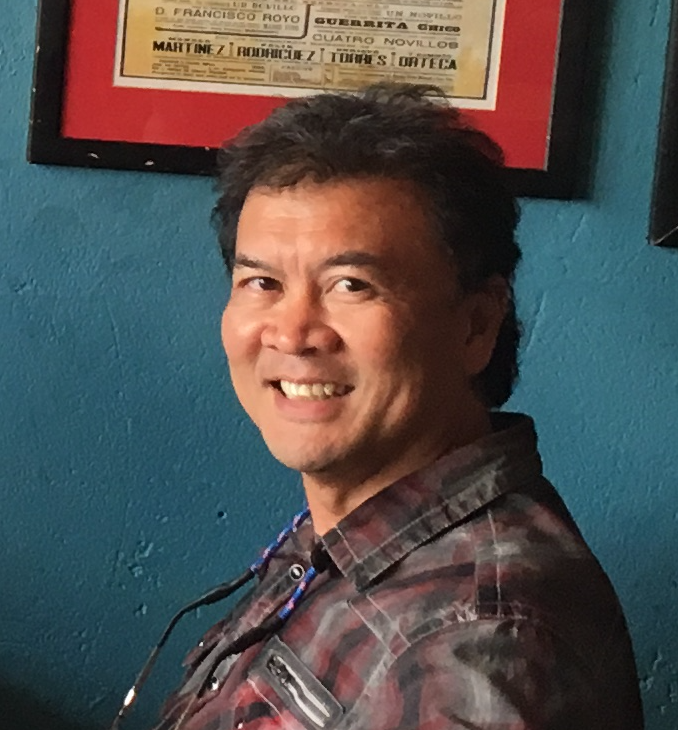

Academic background
- Education: Georgia Tech; Florida State University; George Mason University
- Thesis: (1995)
- Doctoral advisor: Stephen J. O'Brien
- Influences: Charles Darwin, Alan Watts, Henry David Thoreau/Walden, Lynn Margulis, Benjamin Franklin

Academic work
- Institutions: Smithsonian Institution; Harbor Branch Oceanographic Institution
- Main interests: evolution, genomics, symbiosis, systematics microbiology,
- Notable ideas: transposition of mitochondrial DNA

Jose V. Lopez is an American-Filipino Molecular Biologist. He has been a faculty member and Professor of Biology at Nova Southeastern University (NSU) in Dania Beach, Florida, since 2007. Lopez has contributed as a co-founder of the Global Invertebrate Genomics Alliance (GIGA), a community of scientists. He has also participated in the "Porifera—Tree of Life," "Earth Microbiome," and Earth BioGenome projects.

== Education ==
Lopez obtained his bachelor's degree at the Georgia Institute of Technology. He later earned a Master of Science degree focused on molecular biology at the Florida State University and his doctorate in Environmental Biology and Public Policy at George Mason University in Fairfax, supervised by Stephen J. O'Brien. His doctoral dissertation involved the characterization of transpositions of mitochondrial DNA into the nuclei of cats and the naming of NUMT (nuclear mitochondrial DNA) as a common evolutionary genomics phenomenon. Subsequent work has involved the application of molecular genetics to symbiosis and marine biology research (e.g. corals and sponges).

== Career ==
Lopez applied his molecular evolutionary training in postdoctoral appointments with Nancy Knowlton, characterizing the Orbicella (formerly Montastraea) annularis coral sibling species complex at the Smithsonian Tropical Research Institute in Panama, and marine sponge genetics with Shirley Pomponi at Harbor Branch Oceanographic Institute in Ft. Pierce. The latter allowed him to use Johnson Sea-Link submersible technology to investigate deep-sea sponges and corals. Lopez's research on marine sponges has been featured in a South Florida PBS documentary "Sponges: are they the oldest animal in the sea?" on Changing Seas TV. While at NSU's Halmos College of Natural Sciences and Oceanography, his laboratory has applied genomics tools to address various specific questions in marine invertebrate-microbial symbiosis, microbiome ecology, genomics, forensics, metagenomics of oil-exposed organisms, conservation genomics, and systematics/phylogenetics. Lopez was part of the Deep Pelagic Nekton Dynamics (DEEPEND) Consortium of the Gulf of Mexico, led by marine biologist Tracey T. Sutton, to better understand food webs and pelagic microbial distributions in the deep Gulf of Mexico after the Deepwater Horizon oil spill. Lopez has served as an associate editor for the Journal of Heredity since 2008. In 2018, he was awarded an NSU President's Distinguished Professor Award.

Lopez co-founded the Global Invertebrate Genomics Alliance (GIGA), which seeks to promote research and student training into the genomics of marine and aquatic invertebrate animals. After some initial consultations with geneticist Stephen J. O'Brien and seeing the success of the first whole taxa-driven genome sequencing project, Genome10K, Lopez, and collaborators moved to form GIGA in 2013. This involved reaching out to a diverse community of invertebrate biologists, who mostly supported the concept. Support to fund a maiden workshop was provided by the American Genetics Association. GIGA focuses mostly on aquatic animals but has similar problems (relatively inaccessible, small individual animals, low input DNA for sequencing) to the larger invertebrate consortium, Insect5K (i5K). Both GIGA and i5K now help comprise a "network of networks" as part of the Earth BioGenome Project (EBP), launched in December 2018 to try to sequence the whole genomes of 1.5 million eukaryotes.

Besides the well-known symbiosis, Lopez initially hypothesized that sponge microbiomes could serve as indicators for the communities in their immediate seawater environment since sponges are filter feeders. This hypothesis was later proven to be only partially correct (see the high vs. low microbial abundance classification of sponges (HMA, LMA), as growing evidence indicated that many sponge species carry their own adapted symbionts).

Lopez applied the culture-independent molecular tools that arose from the Woeseian revolution of ribosomal RNA-based bacterial systematics. Eventually, molecular identifications expanded to local marine ecosystems as predictors of water quality, human skin microbiomes as possible forensic tools, Myotis bat feces to test for potential microbiome effects on longevity, and the Lake Okeechobee watershed of Florida.

He is the author of the book "Assessments and Conservation of Biological Diversity from Coral Reefs to the Deep Sea," which approaches deep sea marine biodiversity through perspectives on genetics, microbiology, and evolution.

== Personal life ==
Lopez's parents are University of the Philippines graduates, clinical pathologist Ernesto G. and Rosario Lopez, who first met in Binghamton, New York. He is married to Amy Doyle of Plantation, Florida.
