= José López =

José Lopez may refer to:

== Sportspeople ==
=== Baseball ===
- José López (infielder) (born 1983), Venezuelan baseball player
- José López (outfielder) (1901–?), Cuban baseball player
- José López (pitcher) (born 1999), Dominican baseball player

=== Boxing ===
- José Toluco López (1932–1972), Mexican lightweight boxer
- José López (boxer) (born 1972), Puerto Rican boxer
- José Luis López (boxer) (born 1973), Mexican welterweight boxer
- José Eduardo López (born 1990), Mexican light welterweight boxer

=== Cycling ===
- José López (cyclist) (1910–2004), Argentine cyclist
- José Manuel López Rodríguez (born 1940), Spanish cyclist
- José Antonio López (born 1976), Spanish cyclist

=== Football ===
- José López (footballer, born 1914), Spanish footballer
- Juan José López (born 1950), Argentine football manager and former player
- José López Ramírez (born 1975), Spanish 5-a-side football player
- José Luis López (Mexican footballer) (born 1979), Mexican footballer
- José Manuel López (footballer) (born 2000), Argentine footballer
- José Alfredo López (1897–1969), Argentine footballer
- José López (Chilean footballer) (1922–2011), Chilean footballer

=== Other sports ===
- José López (wrestler) (1930–2019), Cuban Olympic wrestler
- José Perurena López (born 1945), Spanish sprint canoer
- José Ramón López (born 1950), Spanish sprint canoer
- José López (athlete) (born 1967), Venezuelan runner
- José María López (born 1983), Argentine race-car driver
- José Luis López (handballer) (born 1998), Chilean handball player

== Politicians ==
- José Hilario López (1798–1869), Colombian president and military officer
- José López Portillo y Rojas (1850–1923), Mexican writer and politician
- José López Rega (1916–1989), Argentine politician
- José López Portillo y Pacheco (1920–2004), Mexican president
- José Francisco López, Argentine politician detained pending trial

== Arts and entertainment ==
- José López Rubio (1903–1996), Spanish writer and director
- José Luis López Vázquez (1922–2009), Spanish actor
- José Serafín López (died 1935), Chilean politician
- José "Nuno" López (born 1951), Puerto Rican politician

== Other ==
- José Antonio López (1781–1841), Spanish Mexican Jesuit
- José M. López (1910–2005), American soldier
- José Salazar López (1910–1991), Mexican cardinal
- José Venancio López (1791–1863), Guatemalan jurist and politician
- José M. López (judge) (born 1949), District of Columbia judge
- Jose V. Lopez, American-Filipino Molecular Biologist
