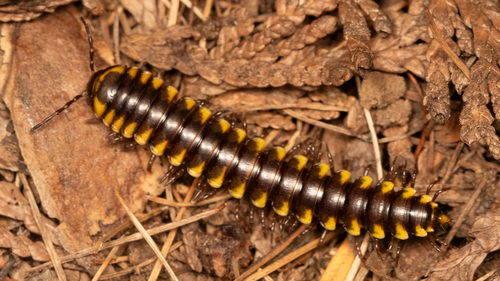

Scientific classification
- Kingdom: Animalia
- Phylum: Arthropoda
- Subphylum: Myriapoda
- Class: Diplopoda
- Order: Polydesmida
- Family: Xystodesmidae
- Genus: Chonaphe
- Species: C. armata

Binomial name
- Chonaphe armata Harger, (1872)

Synonyms
- Species synonymy: Polydesmus armatus Harger, 1872; Leptodesmus armatus Bollman, 1893; Chonaphe cygneia Chamberlin, 1949; Chonaphe patriotica Chamberlin, 1949; Chonaphe serratus Loomis and Schmitt, 1971; Chonaphe serrata Kevan, 1983

= Chonaphe armata =

Species of millipede

Chonaphe armata is a species of Xystodesmid millipede found in the Pacific Northwest of North America. The species was first described as Polydesmus armatus by O. Harger in 1872 and was later moved to the new genus Chonaphe, for which it is the type species, by O. F. Cook in 1904.

== Description ==
Similar to many other Xystodesmid millipedes, C. armata is typically black to brown in base color with yellow tipped paranota. The species shows more color variation than other Pacific Northwest Xystodesmids, however, and can also be found with paranota color ranging from light cream, to orangish-red and with the paranota color forming bands across the tergites of the latter segments.

As with many other species of Xystodesmid, C. armata can produce hydrogen cyanide from ozopores located on the edge of the paranota of each body segment.

== Distribution ==
C. armata inhabits five disjunct populations and is found in the Rocky Mountains of northern Idaho and western Montana, The Okanagan Highlands of Washington, the eastern Cascade Range of Washington and Oregon, and the Blue Mountaints of Oregon.
