= Conservation genomics =

Conservation Genomics is the use of genomic study to aide in the preservation and viability of different and diverse organisms and populations. Genomics can be utilized in order to classify or argue diversity, hybridization, and history as well as identity different and similar species. Genomics can evaluate how these measures relate to effective population size as well as other ideas under the umbrella of conservation genetics, and overall biological conservation. Genomic analysis can evaluate the extent to which alleles at certain loci interact with one and other to display nuanced ways which the genome may be intertwined.

== Genetic diversity ==
Genetic diversity is a measure of the number of different alleles or combinations of alleles present in a population. This may be measured by the amount of heterozygosity measured compared to the expected amount of heterozygosity predicted by Hardy-Weinberg Equilibrium. Evaluating genetic diversity in the genomes of populations can inform us about levels of biodiversity and allele frequencies. Genetics play a large role in the extinction of species and understanding how certain alleles accumulate and interact at the genome level is crucial to the preservation of those species.

== Heterozygosity ==
One of the most important measures of genomic health is the ratio of expected heterozygosity to measured heterozygosity. Generally, an individual or species with more heterozygous alleles have a higher chance of survival. This is known as heterosis. Low levels of heterozygosity is a sign of possible concern for a species or organism. Evaluating the genomes of organisms that exist in an endangered species or population segment can provide insight to the severity of their endangerment. This method can be used to classify and rank species as well.

== Linkage disequilibrium ==
Linkage disequilibrium is a concept that defines the non-random association between two alleles at different loci in the genome. Measures of linkage disequilibrium are useful tools for gene and genome mapping. A linkage between two genes may be due to their positions relative to each other in the genome or it may be due to selection acting to favor certain combinations of alleles. On a genomic scale, linkage disequilibrium plays a large analytical role. The term linkage disequilibrium concedes that there may also be a disruption or lack of linkage between two alleles. Any sort of deviation from the expected linkage between two alleles is considered linkage disequilibrium. In the age of genetic analysis in the use of conservation, understanding how alleles interact with each other is imperative to understanding how genomic diversity, and conservation of such, can be aided.

== Applications ==
Genomics and genomic analysis provide a bigger picture explanation of aggregate smaller genetic evaluations. Different relationships and reasoning can be drawn from the data presented by genomics than compared to that data that can be drawn from genetics. Genomics is beginning its use in the field of invasive species where it is thought that understanding how genomes drive invasive processes can help better protect native species from their devastating effects. These studies are aimed at tackling the major issue of habitat damage and disrupted ecosystems that invasive species have caused.

Under historical contexts, understanding genomic analysis can teach us much about patterns and effects of natural processes. Historical genomic evaluations have been performed on animals like Hominids, and even diseases like Multiple Sclerosis and the Black Death in order to determine their origins and evolutionary histories. In the case of diseases this information is often used in eradication efforts, as it would be used with invasive species. However, this data can be used in the preservation of species as well. Understanding the history of the genomics in a population is an important step in making decisions about how to correctly interpret and apply genomic analysis for conservation today.

In conservational contexts specifically, genomics can be used to research and understand how the relationships amongst the factors listed above affect an organism's fitness. The study of organisms through a genomic lens can lead to knowledge about their history that can be applied today.

=== Hybridization ===
Hybridization practices, as they become a larger player in conservation may be impacted by genomic research. Hybridization can create entirely new allelic relationships and disequilibria. Understanding these factors is important in the interests of effective conservation efforts. Furthermore, studying these new relationships in hybrids can continue to provide insight in the efforts to conserve species. Hybridization still has many critics and has been shown to cause reduced fitness amongst natural populations. There are still many questions about the consequences of hybridization on evolution and genetic health of species. Genomic studies may help to draw conclusions about new allelic relationships and how they may effect the outcomes for those species.

== Current landscape ==
The current landscape of conservation genomics is still in its infancy. New ways to apply and understand genomics for the use of conservation are arising, and there is much thought that the understanding of gene interactions plays an important role in conservation. Currently, despite genomics being valuable to the conservation sphere, there is not enough of a connection between the researchers who study it and those with the means to apply it.
