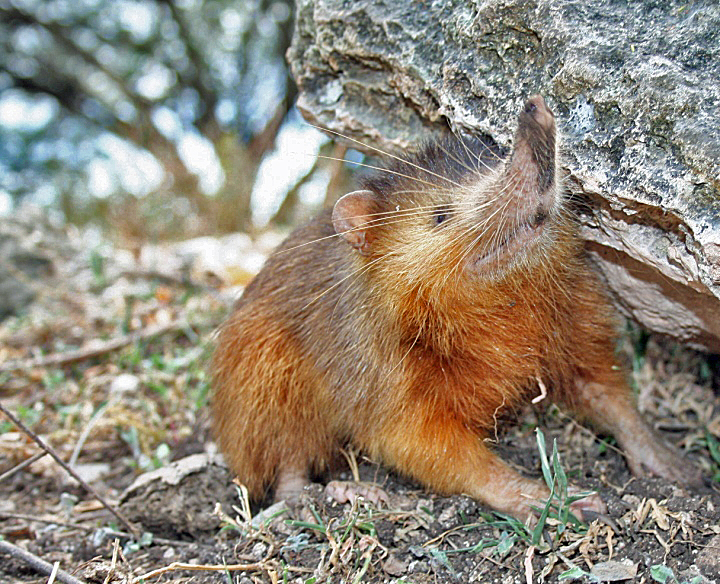
- Hispaniolan solenodon

Scientific classification
- Domain: Eukaryota
- Kingdom: Animalia
- Phylum: Chordata
- Class: Mammalia
- Order: Eulipotyphla
- Family: Solenodontidae
- Genus: Solenodon; Brandt, 1833

Type species
- Solenodon paradoxus Brandt, 1833

Species
- Solenodon paradoxus † Solenodon arredondoi † Solenodon marcanoi

= Solenodon (genus) =

Solenodon Temporal range: Pleistocene–Recent

Genus of mammals

Solenodon is a genus of small, shrew-like mammals native to the Caribbean. It is one of two genera in the solenodon family, Solenodontidae. The genus Solenodon includes three species, only one of which is still living—the Hispaniolan solenodon (Solenodon paradoxus). This classification follows the American Society of Mammalogists.

== Species ==
Image	Scientific name	Common name	Distribution	Status
	S. paradoxus	Hispaniolan solenodon	Hispaniola (Haiti and the Dominican Republic)	LC
	S. arredondoi	Giant solenodon	western Cuba; extinct	EX
	S. marcanoi	Marcano's solenodon	Dominican Republic; extinct	EX

== See also ==
Cuban solenodon - Atopogale cubana, formerly Solenodon cubanus
