= Robert C. Cook =

American geneticist and demographer

- Born: April 9, 1898; Washington, D.C.
- Died: January 7, 1991 (aged 92); Mitchellville, Maryland
- Occupations: Geneticist, demographer, editor
- Parent(s): Orator Fuller Cook; Alice Carter Cook

Robert Carter Cook (April 9, 1898 – January 7, 1991) was an American eugenicist. He was editor of the Journal of Heredity for 40 years, a lecturer in medical genetics and biology at George Washington University, and director, then president, of the Population Reference Bureau in Washington, D.C. He was involved with the eugenics movement of the first half of the 20th century, and claimed authority on population policy and the effects of population growth on the environment.

== Early life and education ==
Cook was born in Washington, D.C., to botanist Orator Fuller Cook and Alice Carter Cook. He was primarily homeschooled, but attended Sidwell Friends School for a year when he was thirteen and attended George Washington University for another year when he was seventeen. Cook is often described as a geneticist and/or a demographer, but was not formally trained in these fields.

== Professional activities ==
During World War I, Cook worked at the National Bureau of Standards, designing airfoils. Cook edited the Journal of Heredity, published by the American Genetic Association, from 1922 to 1962. He was recommended for this post by family friend Alexander Graham Bell. Cook was a lecturer in medical genetics and biology at George Washington University, and director, then president (from 1959 to 1968), of the Population Reference Bureau in Washington, D.C. Cook was a member of the American Eugenics Society, the Population Association of America, and the Cosmos Club.

In 1951, Cook published Human Fertility: The Modern Dilemma. This book described human population growth as the greatest threat to humanity after the atomic bomb and advocated global population control. This book was strongly influenced by the work of Guy Irving Burch. Although Cook utilized research in genetics and demography to advance the American eugenics movement, he did not actually contribute to the production of knowledge in those fields. In 1955, Cook received an award from the Albert and Mary Lasker Foundation for his "outstanding contribution to wider understanding of the world population problem." He made frequent appearances before Congressional committees to testify about population issues. Cook retired in 1968.

== Personal life ==
Cook divorced his first wife, Margaret Brown, with whom he had a daughter. He was briefly engaged to the psychologist Barbara Stoddard Burks, but the two never married due to Burks's untimely death. Cook later married Annabelle Desmond. He died of pneumonia at the age of 92.
