= Jonathan Heeney =

Canadian virologist and immunologist

Jonathan Luke Heeney DVM, DVSc(Path), PhD, ScD, FRCPath, FRCVS is a Canadian infectious disease scholar. He is currently the Professor of Comparative Pathology at the University of Cambridge and holds a number of positions including as head of the Laboratory of Viral Zoonotics — which uses a One Health approach for the prevention of disease outbreaks, and as Chief Scientific Officer (CSO) of DIOSynVax Ltd — a vaccine biotech company in Cambridge that develops next-generation vaccines for pandemic prevention. He is a fellow of Darwin College, and until recently was co-vice-master of the college.

Heeney serves on the boards of international and UK national organisations that promote scholarship, One Health, and the development of vaccines for equitable access and improved global health. He was the chair of the Scientific Advisory Board of the University of Oxford's Jenner institute. He is a trustee and board member of the EuroVacc Foundation, and the Canada-UK Foundation where he continues to promote academic scholarships between Canada and the UK.

== Education ==
Heeney graduated from the University of Guelph with a BSc in Biology in 1980, a Doctorate of Veterinary Medicine in 1984, a Doctorate of Veterinary Science in pathology in 1987, and a PhD awarded in 1989 under the supervision of Stephen J O'Brien at the NIH in Maryland, USA. It was at the NIH that Heeney became interested in viruses that crossed between species (in particular Coronaviruses), causing disease outbreaks of high consequence. In 2012 he was awarded a Doctor of Science (ScD), the highest degree from the University of Cambridge, his fourth doctoral degree.

== Career ==
In his final year of Veterinary Medicine, Heeney undertook an externship in the Department of Pathology, School of Veterinary Medicine at the University of California, Davis with Peter C Kennedy. Later, after completing his work with O'Brien at the NIH, Heeney moved back to California as a Fellow in Pathology at the Stanford School of Medicine at Stanford University to work on human viruses. He later moved to Europe to establish his own lab at TNO in the Netherlands. Later, Heeney became a founding board member and trustee of the EuroVacc foundation based in Lausanne, Switzerland to promote clinical trials of new types of vaccines. Heeney was elected to become a Professor at the University of Cambridge in 2007, renamed the Professor of Comparative Pathology to reflect his work on infectious diseases transmitted between animals and humans. In 2015, during the West African Ebola epidmic, Heeney chaired a session at a WHO meeting on Ebola survivors in Sierra Leone and following field trips to index outbreak villages in Guinea, wrote about his observations in Nature where he hypothesised that this RNA virus could persist not only in animals, but also in human hosts and cause future Ebola flareups. Heeney's hypothesis was demonstrated during the 2021 post-epidemic Ebola flare-up from human 2014/2015 survivors in Guinea. In 2017, Heeney published the book "Plagues" about past epidemics and pandemics, and set up project OVEL in West Africa to monitor viruses in animals to help contribute to better vaccines. In 2021, Project OVEL teamed up with climate scientists and finished second in the Trinity Challenge for the development of the Sentinel Forecasting System for predicting future epidemics. In 2017, Heeney filed patents on a new vaccine antigen platform technology and founded DIOSynVax Ltd. In August 2019, Heeney was awarded one of eight International Gates Grand Challenge awards to develop Universal Influenza vaccines. That work on influenza vaccines helped prepare his team at DIOSynVax at the beginning of COVID-19 pandemic to apply this new vaccine technology to drive a new generation of Coronavirus vaccines, resulting in a pan-Sarbecovirus coronavirus clinical trial. Based on these milestones, CEPI awarded his team a five year, $42m grant, to develop a broadly protective Beta-Coronavirus vaccines towards preventing future Coronavirus pandemics

Heeney is a Fellow of the Royal College of Pathologists and a Fellow of the Royal College of Veterinary Surgeons
