= Stephen J. O'Brien =

American geneticist

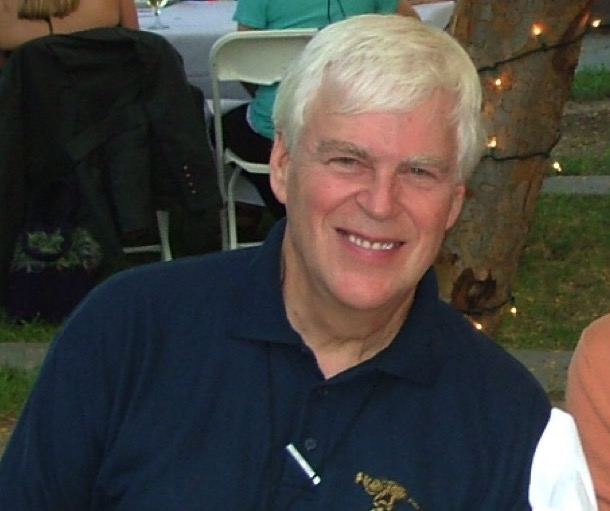
Prof. Stephen J. O'Brien

Stephen J. O'Brien (born 1944) is an American geneticist. He is known for his research contributions in comparative genomics, virology, genetic epidemiology, mammalian systematics and species conservation. Member of the National Academy of Sciences and a Foreign Member of the Russian Academy of Sciences. Author or co-author of over 850 scientific articles and the editor of fourteen volumes.

From 1986 to 2011, O'Brien served as Chief of the Laboratory of Genomic Diversity at the National Cancer Institute (NCI), National Institutes of Health (NIH). In December 2011, he created the Theodosius Dobzhansky Center for Genome Bioinformatics (named after Theodosius Dobzhansky) at St. Petersburg State University, Russia as Chief Scientific Officer.

In January 2013, he joined the Faculty as Professor at the Oceanographic Center, Nova Southeastern University, Ft Lauderdale Florida.

Since November 2019, O'Brien serves as Professor at the Center of Genomic Diversity at ITMO University, St. Petersburg, Russia.

== Career ==
O’Brien received his B.S. in Biology in 1966 from St. Francis College, which presented him with a Distinguished Alumni Award in 1994.

In 1971 he earned a Ph.D. in Genetics from Cornell University, which honored him as “Andrew Dixon White Endowed Professor at Large” in 1998. At Cornell, he expanded the nascent discipline of biochemical genetics, developing the gene-enzyme maps of Drosophila melanogaster. His biochemical mapping would stimulate his editing of six editions of Genetic Maps: Locus Maps of Complex Genomes (1980-1993) (Cold Spring Harbor Laboratory Publications), international unabridged compendiums of plant, animal, bacteria and virus genetic maps that were prelude to the online NCBI gene mapping databases of species whole genome DNA sequences.

In 1983, he and his collaborators discovered the close genetic uniformity of the African cheetah, a prelude to a new discipline of Conservation Genetics. Over three decades of filed studies with his students and colleagues, he subsequently reported over 800 publications, many in the highest rated scientific journals of how genetics could inform and facilitate management action for endangered species. These included identifying new species of elephant, clouded leopard and orangutan plus detailed genetics studies on threatened wildlife species including cheetahs, lions, tigers, giant panda, leopards, pumas, jaguars, koalas, solenodons, and humpback whales.

In 1982, O’Brien's team at the NIH published a comprehensive gene map of domestic cat as cover article in Science and compared genome organization of the cat to human, mouse and other species demonstrating extreme conservation of chromosomal synteny (homologous gene order) between disparate mammalian species. These and subsequent studies established the field of Comparative Genomics. This discipline today remains a baseline for interpreting the organization and evolution of human and established the domestic cat as a genetic model for hereditary cancer and infections diseases in man and animals.

In 1996 O’Brien's team described the first human gene to influence HIV-1 infection and AIDS progression, CCR5-Δ32, using population genetic based association analysis. This discovery has led to several HIV entry inhibitor developments that have been approved by FDA as also stimulated the first real cure of HIV-AIDS in the so-called Berlin patient who permanently cleared HIV when infused with CCR5-Δ32/CCR5-Δ32 donor stem cells in 2006. O’Brien's group used similar genetic association studies to invigorate the field of Genetic Epidemiology, describing over 30 AIDS restriction genes and also applying these gene discovery strategies to chronic infectious human diseases including, hepatitis c, hepatitis b (HBV), hepatocellular carcinoma, and nasopharyngeal carcinoma.

In 2009 O’Brien along with David Haussler and Oliver Ryder founded the Genome10K project, an international consortium of genome scientists working to facilitate the whole genome sequencing, assembly and annotation of 10,000 vertebrate species.

In 2009, he was awarded an honorary Doctorate of Veterinary Medicine from the University of Zurich.

O’Brien has had appointments as adjunct professor at thirteen universities: Harvard University, The Johns Hopkins University, Cornell University, Duke University, St Francis University, Peking University-Beijing, University of Maryland, University of Minnesota, Michigan State University, Colorado State University, George Washington University, George Mason University, and Hood College of Frederick. He has mentored more than fifteen Ph.D. students including: Roger Reeves, Dennis Gilbert, Robert Wayne, Cheryl Winkler, Jose Lopez, Melanie Culver, Eduardo Eizirik, Olga Uphyrkina, Carlos Driscoll, Meredith Brown, and Shu Jin Luo in addition to eight M.S. theses and over thirty post-doctoral fellows. Since 1996 he has directed a short course sponsored by The Smithsonian and American Genetics Association, entitled “Recent Advances in Conservation Genetics”, the most recent (2018) edition at Front Royal, Virginia, U.S.A.

In 2018, O'Brien was elected to the National Academy of Sciences. In 2016 O'Brien was elected as a Foreign Member of the Russian Academy of Sciences. He was also elected to the American Academy of Arts and Science, to the Explorer's Club, and to the Cosmos Club. He served as President of the NIH Assembly of Scientists, as Chairman of the International Committee on Comparative Gene Mapping for the Human Genome Organization (HUGO). O'Brien founded and co-directs NOAHS (New Opportunities in Animal Health Sciences), a consortium of scientists and apprentices, part of the Smithsonian Institution/National Zoological Park, that works to apply biomedical technology on behalf of species conservation and to training a generation of conservation scientists. He has served as the Chairman of the Science Advisory Board for The International BarCode of Life Project and Chairman of the Board of the Cheetah Conservation Fund.

O'Brien is the author or co-author of over 850 scientific articles and the editor of fourteen volumes. In 2004 he published a book of science adventure stories entitled “Tears of the Cheetah And Other Tales From The Genetic Frontier” (St. Martin's Pres NYC); in 2007, he published a comprehensive “Atlas of Mammalian Chromosomes”, a photo-compendium of the karyotype of nearly 1000 species of mammals, (John Wiley Inc. NYC). O'Brien has served as Editor of six editions of Genetic Maps: Locus Maps of Complex Genomes (Cold Spring Harbor Laboratory Press); Editor of Journal of Heredity (American Genetics Association) from 1987-2007; Editor for Isozyme Bulletin; Editorial Board Member for GigaScience, Associate Editor for Genomics; Human Genomics, Mammalian Genome, Molecular Phylogenetics and Evolution, and Cosmos.
