= Genetic conservation =

Genetic conservation may refer to:

- Conserved sequences, DNA or protein sequences that are conserved over evolutionary time
- Conservation genetics, the field of science concerned with maintaining genetic diversity
