= José Ángel López =

José Ángel López may refer to:

- José Ángel López (footballer, born 1999), Mexican football forward for Zemplín Michalovce
- José Ángel López (footballer, born 2006), Spanish football right-back for Espanyol B
- José Ángel López Jorrin (born 1948), Spanish diplomat, ambassador to Bulgaria in 2001–2004

== See also ==
- José López (disambiguation)
