= Chonaphe =

Scientific classification
- Kingdom: Animalia
- Phylum: Arthropoda
- Subphylum: Myriapoda
- Class: Diplopoda
- Order: Polydesmida
- Family: Xystodesmidae
- Genus: Chonaphe; Cook, 1904

Genus of millipedes

Chonaphe is a genus of millipedes belonging to the family Xystodesmidae.

The species of this genus are found in Western North America. There are, as of 1994, four described species

Species:

- Chonaphe armata (Harger, 1872)
- Chonaphe evexa Shelley, 1994
- Chonaphe remissa Chamberlin, 1949
- Chonaphe schizoterminalis Shelley, 1994
