= Alice Carter Cook =

American horticulturist and author (1868–1943)

- Born: Alice Carter; April 8, 1868; New York City
- Died: June 14, 1943 (aged 75)
- Education: Syracuse University; Cornell University; Mount Holyoke Seminary
- Spouse: Orator Fuller Cook
- Children: 4, including Robert C. Cook
- Scientific career
- Fields: Botany

Alice Carter Cook (April 8, 1868 – June 14, 1943; born Alice Carter) was an American botanist and author whose plant collections are now held by the Smithsonian Institution and the Academy of Natural Sciences of Philadelphia.

Cook was the first woman to receive a PhD in botany from an American university.

== Biography ==
Carter was born in New York City on April 8, 1868 to Samuel Thompson Carter and Alantha Carter (née Pratt). Her father was a clergyman in Huntington, New York.

Carter studied at Mount Holyoke Seminary before enrolling at Syracuse University for her doctorate. She graduated in 1888, receiving the first doctorate in botany for a woman from an American University.

Carter taught at Mount Holyoke for three years before attending Cornell University where she earned an M.S. in botany, in 1892. That same year, she married botanist Orator Fuller Cook. The couple later traveled on expeditions to Africa and the Canary Islands.

Cook worked with botanist Henrietta Hooker. Cook had two sons and two daughters; her son Robert Carter Cook became a geneticist and demographer.

Cook died on June 14, 1943. Her plant collections were donated to the Smithsonian Institution and the Academy of Natural Sciences.

== Publications ==
In addition to botanical publications, Cook contributed several articles to Popular Science Monthly and Ladies' Home Journal. .

Cook also wrote an anthropological profile of the indigenous native people of the Canary Islands, and published poems, short stories, and two plays.
