= Marcano's solenodon =

Conservation status
- Extinct (yes) (IUCN 3.1)

Scientific classification
- Kingdom: Animalia
- Phylum: Chordata
- Class: Mammalia
- Order: Eulipotyphla
- Family: Solenodontidae
- Genus: Solenodon
- Species: †S. marcanoi

Binomial name
- †Solenodon marcanoi (Patterson, 1962)

Synonyms
- Atopogale marcanoi; Antillogale marcanoi

Extinct species of mammal

Marcano's solenodon (Solenodon marcanoi) is an extinct species of mammal in the family Solenodontidae known only from skeletal remains found on the island of Hispaniola (today the Dominican Republic and Haiti).

== Etymology ==
The specific epithet, marcanoi, is in honor of the Dominican botanist, entomologist, herpetologist, speleologist and researcher Eugenio de Jesús Marcano Fondeur.

== Description ==
The species was smaller than the other extant member of its genus, the sympatric Hispaniolan solenodon (S. paradoxus). Marcano's solenodon's limb bones were comparatively shorter than in S. paradoxus, suggesting smaller size and possibly short stature. Like its congenerics, it probably was a nocturnal, burrowing, shrew-like mammal with a long snout, that fed on insects, earthworms, small reptiles, birds, amphibians, and mammals.

== History ==
The remains were found in association with those from rats of the genus Rattus, which suggests that Marcano's solenodon survived until the time of European colonization of the island, and may have gone extinct due to predation from introduced rodents.
