= Noninvasive genotyping =

Noninvasive genotyping is a modern technique for obtaining DNA for genotyping that is characterized by the indirect sampling of specimen, not requiring harm to, handling of, or even the presence of the organism of interest. Beginning in the early 1990s, with the advent of PCR, researchers have been able to obtain high-quality DNA samples from small quantities of hair, feathers, scales, or excrement. These noninvasive samples are an improvement over older allozyme and DNA sampling techniques that often required larger samples of tissue or the destruction of the studied organism. Noninvasive genotyping is widely utilized in conservation efforts, where capture and sampling may be difficult or disruptive to behavior. Additionally, in medicine, this technique is being applied in humans for the diagnosis of genetic disease and early detection of tumors. In this context, invasivity takes on a separate definition where noninvasive sampling also includes simple blood samples.

== Conservation ==
In conservation, noninvasive genotyping is an important part of implementing the 3Rs principles. Modern DNA amplification methods allow researchers to use a variety of animal material collected in the field, including feces, hair, and feathers, to gain insights into effective population size, gene flow, and hybridization. Despite the potential that noninvasive genotyping has in conservation genetics efforts, it is still not broadly used, potentially due to problems with degradation, contamination or a lower DNA quality in comparison with blood or tissue samples. However, optimized laboratory protocols and specialized extraction kits can help overcome these issues.

== Medicine ==
=== Fetal Genotyping ===
The most common use of noninvasive genotyping in medicine is non-invasive prenatal diagnosis (NIPD), which provides an alternative to riskier techniques such as amniocentesis. With the discovery of cell-free fetal DNA in maternal plasma, NIPD became a popular method for determining sex, paternity, aneuploidy, and the occurrence of monogenic diseases as it requires only a simple blood sample. One NIPD provider maintains that a 10 mL blood sample will provide 99% accurate detection of basic genomic abnormalities as early as 10 weeks into pregnancy. The karyotype below is that of an individual with trisomy 21, or Down syndrome, which is what is most routinely checked for by NIPD screens.

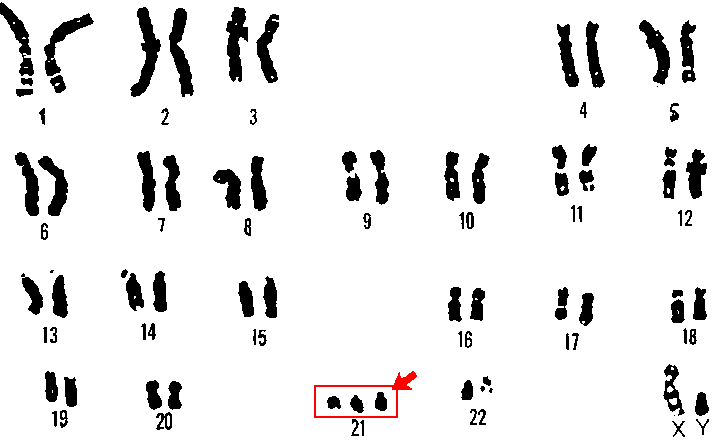

=== Tumor detection ===
This same technique is also utilized to identify the incidence of tumor DNA in the blood, which can both provide early detection of tumor growth and indicate relapse in cancer. Circulating tumor DNA can be found in the blood before metastasis occurs and, therefore, detection of certain mutant alleles may enhance survival rates in cancer patients. In a recent study, ctDNA was shown to be "a broadly applicable, sensitive, and specific biomarker that can be used for a variety of clinical and research purposes in patients with multiple different types of cancer". This technique is often referred to as a liquid biopsy, and has not been widely implemented in clinical settings although its impact could be quite large. Although blood-borne ctDNA remains the most clinically significant noninvasive cancer detection, other studies have emerged that investigate other potential methods, including detection of colorectal cancer via fecal samples.

== Methods ==
The method by which samples are collected in noninvasive genotyping is what separates the technique from traditional genotyping, and there are a number of ways that this is accomplished. In the field, procured samples of tissue are captured, the tissue is dissolved, and the DNA is purified, although the exact procedure differs between different samples. Following the collection of DNA samples, PCR technology is utilized to amplify particular genetic sequences, with PCR primer specificity avoiding contamination from other DNA sources. Then, the DNA can be analyzed using a number of genomic techniques, similarly to traditionally obtained samples.
