= Giant solenodon =

Giant solenodon Temporal range: Early Holocene

Scientific classification
- Kingdom: Animalia
- Phylum: Chordata
- Class: Mammalia
- Order: Eulipotyphla
- Family: Solenodontidae
- Genus: Atopogale
- Species: †A. arredondoi

Binomial name
- †Atopogale arredondoi Morgan & Ottenwalder, 1993

Extinct species of mammal

The giant solenodon (Atopogale arredondoi) is an extinct species of mammal that occurred in western Cuba. A larger animal than the still-extant Cuban solenodon (Atopogale cubana), the species is believed to have been eradicated through habitat destruction and the introduction of predatory dogs to Cuba by pre-Columbian people.
