= Conservation genetics =

Interdisciplinary study of extinction avoidance

Conservation genetics is an interdisciplinary subfield of population genetics that aims to understand the dynamics of genes in a population for the purpose of natural resource management, conservation of genetic diversity, and the prevention of species extinction. Scientists involved in conservation genetics come from a variety of fields, including population genetics, research in natural resource management, molecular ecology, molecular biology, evolutionary biology, and systematics. The genetic diversity within species is one of the three fundamental components of biodiversity (along with species diversity and ecosystem diversity), so it is an important consideration in the wider field of conservation biology.

== Genetic diversity ==
Genetic diversity is the total amount of genetic variability within a species. It can be measured in several ways, including: observed heterozygosity, expected heterozygosity, the mean number of alleles per locus, the percentage of loci that are polymorphic, and estimated effective population size. Genetic diversity on the population level is a crucial focus for conservation genetics as it influences both the health of individuals and the long-term survival of populations: decreased genetic diversity has been associated with reduced average fitness of individuals, such as high juvenile mortality, reduced immunity, diminished population growth, and ultimately, higher extinction risk.

Heterozygosity, a fundamental measurement of genetic diversity in population genetics, plays an important role in determining the chance of a population surviving environmental change, novel pathogens not previously encountered, as well as the average fitness within a population over successive generations. Heterozygosity is also deeply connected, in population genetics theory, to population size (which itself clearly has a fundamental importance to conservation). All things being equal, small populations will be less heterozygous – across their whole genomes – than comparable, but larger, populations. This lower heterozygosity (i.e. low genetic diversity) renders small populations more susceptible to the challenges mentioned above.

In a small population, over successive generations and without gene flow, the probability of mating with close relatives becomes very high, leading to inbreeding depression – a reduction in average fitness of individuals within a population. The reduced fitness of the offspring of closely related individuals is fundamentally tied to the concept of heterozygosity, as the offspring of these kinds of pairings are, by necessity, less heterozygous (more homozygous) across their whole genomes than outbred individuals. A diploid individual with the same maternal and paternal grandfather, for example, will have a much higher chance of being homozygous at any loci inherited from the paternal copies of each of their parents' genomes than would an individual with unrelated maternal and paternal grandfathers (each diploid individual inherits one copy of their genome from their mother and one from their father).

High homozygosity (low heterozygosity) reduces fitness because it exposes the phenotypic effects of recessive alleles at homozygous sites. Selection can favour the maintenance of alleles which reduce the fitness of homozygotes, the textbook example being the sickle-cell beta-globin allele, which is maintained at high frequencies in populations where malaria is endemic due to the highly adaptive heterozygous phenotype (resistance to the malarial parasite Plasmodium falciparum).

Low genetic diversity also reduces the opportunities for chromosomal crossover during meiosis to create new combinations of alleles on chromosomes, effectively increasing the average length of unrecombined tracts of chromosomes inherited from parents. This in turn reduces the efficacy of selection, across successive generations, to remove fitness-reducing alleles and promote fitness-enhancing alleles from a population. A simple hypothetical example would be two adjacent genes – A and B – on the same chromosome in an individual. If the allele at A promotes fitness "one point", while the allele at B reduces fitness "one point", but the two genes are inherited together, then selection cannot favour the allele at A while penalising the allele at B – the fitness balance is "zero points". Recombination can swap out alternative alleles at A and B, allowing selection to promote the optimal alleles to the optimal frequencies in the population – but only if there are alternative alleles to choose between.

The fundamental connection between genetic diversity and population size in population genetics theory can be clearly seen in the classic population genetics measure of genetic diversity, the Watterson estimator, in which genetic diversity is measured as a function of effective population size and mutation rate. Given the relationship between population size, mutation rate, and genetic diversity, it is clearly important to recognise populations at risk of losing genetic diversity before problems arise as a result of the loss of that genetic diversity. Once lost, genetic diversity can only be restored by mutation and gene flow. If a species is already on the brink of extinction there will likely be no populations to use to restore diversity by gene flow, and any given population will be small and therefore diversity will accumulate in that population by mutation much more slowly than it would in a comparable, but bigger, population (since there are fewer individuals whose genomes are mutating in a smaller population than a bigger population).

== Contributors to extinction ==
Species extinction can be attributed to a multitude of factors. Inbreeding of closely related individuals has been known to reduce the genetic fitness of a larger population. Inbreeding depression from reduced fitness has long been theorized to be a link towards extinction. Lethal or non-advantageous allelic combinations increase, with disease susceptibility and lower fertility rates rising in both plant and animal populations. In small, inbreeding populations, an increase in deleterious mutations may also arise, further reducing fitness and allowing for further genetic complications.

Population fragmentation may also contribute toward species extinction. Habitat loss or natural events may cut populations off from one another, resulting in two or more groups having little to no contact with each other. Fragmentation may induce inbreeding in these smaller populations.

When two populations with distinct genetic makeups mate, outbreeding depression may occur and reduce the fitness of one or both populations. Outbreeding depression and its consequences can be just as detrimental as inbreeding depression. Some conservation efforts focus on the genetic distinctions between populations of the same species. Outbreeding depression could affect the success rate of these conservation efforts.

== Techniques ==
Specific genetic techniques are used to assess the genomes of a species regarding specific conservation issues as well as general population structure. This analysis can be done in two ways, with current DNA of individuals or historic DNA.

Techniques for analyzing the differences between individuals and populations include

1. Alloenzymes
2. Random fragment length polymorphisms
3. Amplified fragment length polymorphisms
4. Random amplification of polymorphic DNA
5. Single strand conformation polymorphism
6. Minisatellites
7. Microsatellites
8. Single-nucleotide polymorphisms
9. DNA sequencing

These different techniques focus on different variable areas of the genomes within animals and plants. The specific information that is required determines which techniques are used and which parts of the genome are analysed. For example, mitochondrial DNA in animals has a high substitution rate, which makes it useful for identifying differences between individuals. However, it is only inherited in the female line, and the mitochondrial genome is relatively small. In plants, the mitochondrial DNA has very high rates of structural mutations, so is rarely used for genetic markers, as the chloroplast genome can be used instead. Other sites in the genome that are subject to high mutation rates such as the major histocompatibility complex, and the microsatellites and minisatellites are also frequently used.

These techniques can provide information on long-term conservation of genetic diversity and expound demographic and ecological matters such as taxonomy.

Another technique is using historic DNA for genetic analysis. Historic DNA is important because it allows geneticists to understand how species reacted to changes to conditions in the past. This is a key to understanding the reactions of similar species in the future.

Techniques using historic DNA include looking at preserved remains found in museums and caves. Museums are used because there is a wide range of species that are available to scientists all over the world. The problem with museums is that, historical perspectives are important because understanding how species reacted to changes in conditions in the past is a key to understanding reactions of similar species in the future. Evidence found in caves provides a longer perspective and does not disturb the animals.

Another technique that relies on specific genetics of an individual is noninvasive monitoring, which uses extracted DNA from organic material that an individual leaves behind, such as a feather. Environmental DNA (eDNA) can be extracted from soil, water, and air. Organisms deposit tissue cells into the environment and the degradation of these cells results in DNA being released into the environment. This too avoids disrupting the animals and can provide information about the sex, movement, kinship and diet of an individual.

Other more general techniques can be used to correct genetic factors that lead to extinction and risk of extinction. For example, when minimizing inbreeding and increasing genetic variation multiple steps can be taken. Increasing heterozygosity through immigration, increasing the generational interval through cryopreservation or breeding from older animals, and increasing the effective population size through equalization of family size all helps minimize inbreeding and its effects. Deleterious alleles arise through mutation, however certain recessive ones can become more prevalent due to inbreeding. Deleterious mutations that arise from inbreeding can be removed by purging, or natural selection. Populations raised in captivity with the intent of being reintroduced in the wild suffer from adaptations to captivity.

Inbreeding depression, loss of genetic diversity, and genetic adaptation to captivity are disadvantageous in the wild, and many of these issues can be dealt with through the aforementioned techniques aimed at increasing heterozygosity. In addition creating a captive environment that closely resembles the wild and fragmenting the populations so there is less response to selection also help reduce adaptation to captivity.

Solutions to minimize the factors that lead to extinction and risk of extinction often overlap because the factors themselves overlap. For example, deleterious mutations are added to populations through mutation, however the deleterious mutations conservation biologists are concerned with are ones that are brought about by inbreeding, because those are the ones that can be taken care of by reducing inbreeding. Here the techniques to reduce inbreeding also help decrease the accumulation of deleterious mutations.

== Applications ==
These techniques have wide-ranging applications. One example is in defining species and subspecies of salmonids. Hybridization is an especially important issue in salmonids and this has wide-ranging conservation, political, social and economic implications.

More specific example, the Cutthroat Trout. In analysis of its mtDNA and alloenzymes, hybridization between native and non-native species has been shown to be one of the major factors contributing to the decline in its populations. This has led to efforts to remove some hybridized populations so native populations could breed more readily. Cases like these impact everything from the economy of local fishermen to larger companies, such as timber.

Defining species and subspecies has conservation implication in mammals, too. For example, the northern white rhino and southern white rhino were previously mistakenly identified as the same species given their morphological similarities, but recent mtDNA analyses showed that the species are genetically distinct. As a result, the northern white rhino population has dwindled to near-extinction due to poaching crisis, and the prior assumption that it could freely breed with the southern population is revealed to be a misguided approach in conservation efforts.

More recent applications include using forensic genetic identification to identify species in cases of poaching. Wildlife DNA registers are used to regulate trade of protected species, species laundering, and poaching. Conservation genetics techniques can be used alongside a variety of scientific disciplines. For example, landscape genetics has been used in conjunction with conservation genetics to identify corridors and population dispersal barriers to give insight into conservation management.

== Development and history ==
Conservation genetics applies genetic principles and technologies to the management and preservation of biodiversity. It integrates organismal biology, population genetics, bioinformatics, and ecology to understand how genetic factors affect the survival, reproduction, and adaptive potential of populations and species, and to design strategies that prevent extinction. Early conceptual foundations emphasized the importance of preserving genetic diversity to buffer populations against inbreeding, disease, and environmental change. Empirical studies soon linked demographic history with reduced variation and fitness costs in small or bottlenecked populations, as shown in elephant seals, cheetahs, and other mammals. These insights were distilled in influential texts that formalized the genetic basis of conservation practice.

From the 1970s to the 1990s, methodological progress moved from allozymes to restriction fragment length polymorphisms (RFLPs), PCR-based mitochondrial DNA assays, and then to nuclear DNA markers such as microsatellites and SNPs, broadening the resolution of genetic inference in wild populations. Early molecular applications included black rhinoceros mtDNA, whaling surveillance via forensic genetics, and genetic monitoring frameworks. Case studies demonstrated that genetic restoration can reverse inbreeding depression and improve demographic trajectories, as famously shown for the Florida panther.

By the 2000s–2010s, next-generation sequencing (NGS) catalyzed the transition from conservation genetics to conservation genomics, enabling routine incorporation of thousands to millions of loci and whole genomes into assessments of biodiversity, demography, connectivity, and adaptation. Practical guidance emerged on reduced-representation and low-coverage WGS strategies, trade-offs, and filtering, broadening access for non-model taxa.

Genome assemblies, once a bottleneck, advanced markedly through coordinated international efforts (e.g., Genome 10K; Vertebrate Genomes Project), allowing chromosome-scale reference genomes to guide conservation analyses and management decisions. With such resources, genomic case studies have revealed aquatic adaptation and diversity loss in otters, refined phylogeography and subspecies in iconic carnivores, and provided tools for forensic wildlife management and ex-situ population monitoring.

Genomic time series, ROH scans, and load estimation have clarified how bottlenecks and inbreeding shape fitness and extinction risk, including in northern elephant seals and killer whales, and across taxa more broadly. At the same time, genomics continues to inform practical conservation through genetic monitoring, translocations, cloning for genetic rescue, and policy-relevant forensics.

Building equitable global capacity remains a central challenge because expertise and infrastructure are unevenly distributed geographically. International training initiatives, such as the long-running "Recent Advances in Conservation Genetics" (ConGen Global) course founded by Stephen J. O'Brien and supported by the American Genetic Association, have helped disseminate methods, standardize analyses, and connect researchers to HPC resources and reproducible workflows, accelerating uptake of genomic tools in regions near biodiversity hotspots. Examples include open, version-controlled tutorials, ACCESS-enabled cloud/HPC environments, and teaching practices that emphasize reproducibility and collaboration. Complementary programs (e.g., Physalia, ConGen Population Genomic Data Analysis, USFWS Applied Conservation Genetics) further widen access to modern population-genomic analyses.

Conservation genomics now underpins management decisions from genetic rescue to reintroductions, while informing ethical debates around de-extinction, assisted reproduction, and the integration of novel technologies. Research on diverse taxa (e.g., parrots, solenodons, echinoderms) shows how community-driven genome projects and marker development inform both in-situ and ex-situ strategies, while training the next generation of scientists.

As the field continues to evolve, syntheses highlight the centrality of genome-wide variation for long-term persistence, the need to integrate genetic EBVs (essential biodiversity variables) into conservation policy, and the value of cross-disciplinary training to translate methods into practice. Reviews and perspectives also stress translating genomic findings into actionable conservation, including in regions where capacity is still developing.

== Implications ==
New technology in conservation genetics has many implications for the future of conservation biology. At the molecular level, new technologies are advancing. Some of these techniques include the analysis of minisatellites and MHC. These molecular techniques have wider effects from clarifying taxonomic relationships, as in the previous example, to determining the best individuals to reintroduce to a population for recovery by determining kinship. These effects then have consequences that reach even further. Conservation of species has implications for humans in the economic, social, and political realms. In the biological realm increased genotypic diversity has been shown to help ecosystem recovery, as seen in a community of grasses which was able to resist disturbance to grazing geese through greater genotypic diversity. Because species diversity increases ecosystem function, increasing biodiversity through new conservation genetic techniques has wider reaching effects than before.

A short list of studies a conservation geneticist may research include:

1. Phylogenetic classification of species, subspecies, geographic races, and populations, and measures of phylogenetic diversity and uniqueness.
2. Identifying hybrid species, hybridization in natural populations, and assessing the history and extent of introgression between species.
3. Population genetic structure of natural and managed populations, including identification of Evolutionary Significant Units (ESUs) and management units for conservation.
4. Assessing genetic variation within a species or population, including small or endangered populations, and estimates such as effective population size (Ne).
5. Measuring the impact of inbreeding and outbreeding depression, and the relationship between heterozygosity and measures of fitness (see Fisher's fundamental theorem of natural selection).
6. Evidence of disrupted mate choice and reproductive strategy in disturbed populations.
7. Forensic applications, especially for the control of trade in endangered species.
8. Practical methods for monitoring and maximizing genetic diversity during captive breeding programs and re-introduction schemes, including mathematical models and case studies.
9. Conservation issues related to the introduction of genetically modified organisms.
10. The interaction between environmental contaminants and the biology and health of an organism, including changes in mutation rates and adaptation to local changes in the environment (e.g. industrial melanism).
11. New techniques for noninvasive genotyping, see noninvasive genotyping for conservation.
12. Monitor genetic variability in populations and assess genes of fitness amongst organism populations.

== See also ==
- Animal genetic resources
- Forest genetic resources
- The State of the World's Animal Genetic Resources for Food and Agriculture
