= African cheetah =

African cheetah refers to any of the following cheetah (Acinonyx jubatus) subspecies native to Africa:

- Southeast African cheetah (Acinonyx jubatus jubatus)
- Northeast African cheetah (Acinonyx jubatus soemmeringii)
- Northwest African cheetah (Acinonyx jubatus hecki)
