= Essential Biodiversity Variables =

Essential Biodiversity Variables (EBVs) is a putative set of parameters intended to be the minimum set of broadly agreed upon necessary and sufficient biodiversity variables for at least national to global monitoring, researching, and forecasting of biodiversity. They are being developed by an interdisciplinary group of governmental and academic research partners. The initiative aims for a harmonised global biodiversity monitoring system. EBVs would be used to inform biodiversity change indicators, such as the CBD Biodiversity Indicators for the Aichi Targets.

The concept is partly based on the earlier Essential Climate Variables. It can be generalised as the minimum set of variables for describing and predicting a system's state and dynamics. Areas with more developed EV lists include climate, ocean, and biodiversity.

== EBV Classes / Categories ==
The current candidate EBVs occupy six classes of Essential Biodiversity Variables: genetic composition, species populations, species traits, community composition, ecosystem structure, and ecosystem function. Within each class are a few to several variables.

EBV Class	EBV	Notes
Genetic composition	Co-ancestry	
Genetic composition	Allelic diversity	
Genetic composition	Population genetic differentiation	
Genetic composition	Breed and variety diversity	
Species populations	Species distribution	Addressed in. Track from space.
Species populations	Population abundance	Addressed in.
Species populations	Population age / size structure	
Species traits (subject of)	Phenology	Track from space. GlobDiversity RS-enabled EBV (land surface phenology).
Species traits (subject of)	Body mass	Vegetation height—track from space.
Species traits (subject of)	Natal dispersal distance	
Species traits (subject of)	Migratory behaviour	
Species traits (subject of)	Demographic traits	
Species traits (subject of)	Physiological traits	Track from space. GlobDiversity RS-enabled EBV (canopy chlorophyll concentration).
Community composition	Taxonomic diversity	
Community composition	Species interactions	
Ecosystem function	Net primary production	Track from space.
Ecosystem function	Secondary production	
Ecosystem function	Nutrient retention	
Ecosystem function	Disturbance regime	Track from space. Should not be a candidate EBV, due to being non-biological in nature.
Ecosystem structure	Habitat structure	
Ecosystem structure	Ecosystem extent and fragmentation	Track from space. GlobDiversity RS-enabled EBV (fragmentation).
Ecosystem structure	Ecosystem composition by functional type	

== Associated projects and organisations ==
As of 2017, participants in the project consist of the GlobDiversity project (funded by the European Space Agency) under GEO BON (Group on Earth Observations Biodiversity Observation Network. a cooperative project of international universities), and the GLOBIS-B project (Global Infrastructures for Supporting Biodiversity Research; funded by the EU Horizon 2020 programme).

== Development ==
The concept was first proposed in 2012 and developed in the following years.

The GLOBIS-B global cooperation project, aimed to advance the challenge of practical implementation of EBVs by supporting interoperability and cooperation activities among diverse biodiversity infrastructures, started in 2015. The GlobDiversity project of GEO BON, led by the University of Zurich, started in 2017, focusing on specification and engineering of three RS-enabled EBVs.

The scope and screening of potential variables is under ongoing discussion.

This includes definition of the species distribution EBV and population abundance EBV, operationalisation of the EBV framework, data and tools for building EBV data products, workflow for building EBV data products, metadata and data sharing standards; and possible integration of abiotic variables (e.g. those emphasised in the Ecosystem Integrity framework) with biotic variables (emphasised in the EBV framework) to achieve comprehensive ecosystem monitoring.

"EBV data products" refers to the end product in the EBV information supply chain, from raw observations, to EBV-usable data, to EBV-ready data, to EBV data products. Each of these three types of EBV datasets could be used to produce indicators. Data sources for EBVs are categorised into four types: extensive and intensive monitoring schemes, ecological field studies, and remote sensing. Each have their own often complementary properties, implying that data integration will be important for creation of representative EBVs, as well as identifying and filling data gaps.
