= Orator F. Cook =

American botanist (1867–1949)

Orator Fuller Cook
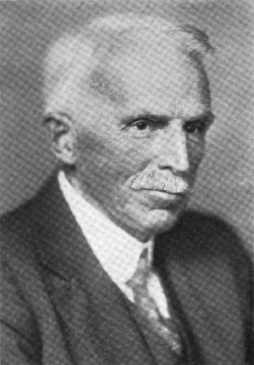
- Born: May 28, 1867; Clyde, New York
- Died: April 23, 1949 (aged 81); Lanham, Maryland
- Education: Syracuse University
- Known for: Coining of "speciation"
- Spouse: Alice Carter Cook
- Children: Robert Carter Cook
- Scientific career
- Fields: Botany, entomology
- Workplaces: USDA
- Author abbrev. (botany): O.F.Cook
- Author abbrev. (zoology): Cook

Orator Fuller Cook Jr. (May 28, 1867 – April 23, 1949) was an American botanist, entomologist, and agronomist, known for his work on cotton and rubber cultivation and for coining the term "speciation" to describe the process by which new species arise from existing ones. He published nearly 400 articles on topics such as genetics, evolution, sociology, geography, and anthropology.

== Early life and education ==
Cook was born in Clyde, New York in 1867, the son of Orator Fuller and Eliza (née Hookway) Cook. His father was a stonemason from England who had immigrated in 1855. Orator Jr. grew up in Clyde, taught biology for two years before entering university, and graduated from Syracuse University with a B.A. in 1890. He subsequently worked as a biology instructor there the following year.

== Career ==
In 1891 Cook became a special agent of the New York State Colonization Society. He worked in Liberia, and in 1896, he was elected president of Liberia College. He held that position until 1898. That year he joined the United States Department of Agriculture as a plant scientist, and eventually became Principal Botanist and traveled throughout the world investigating crop species for the United States government. With Guy N. Collins, he made collecting trips to Puerto Rico in 1899 and 1901. Cook specialized in cotton and rubber plants and the classification of palms, particularly the palms of Hispaniola. He published almost four hundred books and articles during his career, and was awarded an honorary Doctorate of Science by Syracuse University in 1930. Cook served as Honorary Assistant Curator of Cryptogamic Collections at the United States National Herbarium from 1898 until 1948. Together with Lucien Marcus Underwood he was editor of the exsiccata work An Illustrated Century of Fungi with 100 specimens (1889) and the exsiccata work Hepaticae Americanae with 200 specimens (1887–99).

Cook also studied myriapods (millipedes, centipedes, and relatives), describing over 100 species and producing over 50 publications. In 1922, Cook and his colleague Harold Loomis described a species of millipede with more legs than any other organism then known on Earth: Illacme plenipes which possesses as many as 750 legs.

Cook was a member of the American Association for the Advancement of Science, American Genetic Association, Botanical Society of America, Association of American Geographers, Washington Academy of Sciences, as well as the Cosmos Club, a private social club of Washington D.C.

The standard author abbreviation O.F.Cook is used to indicate this person as the author when citing a botanical name.

== Family ==
In 1892 Cook married the botanist Alice Carter, with whom he had two sons and two daughters. His son Robert Carter Cook became a geneticist.
