= José López (outfielder) =

Cuban baseball player (born 1901)

- Corner outfielder / Third baseman / Shortstop
- Born: 1901; Regla, Cuba
- Died: Unknown
- Batted: Right Threw: Right

Negro league baseball debut
- 1920, for the Cuban Stars (West)

Last appearance
- 1920, for the Cuban Stars (West)
- Stats at Baseball Reference

Teams
- Habana (1918); Almendares (1918); Habana (1920); Cuban Stars (West) (1920); Greeneville Burley Cubs (1921); Habana (1921–1922); Muskegon Anglers (1923); Columbus Senators (1924); Hamilton Clippers (1925); Waco Cubs (1926); Quincy Red Birds (1926); Evansville Hubs (1927); Team Cuba (1927–1928)

José Dionisio López (1901 – death date unknown) was a Cuban professional baseball corner outfielder, third baseman and shortstop in the Negro leagues and the Cuban League in the 1910s and 1920s.

A native of Regla, Cuba, López played in the Negro leagues for the Cuban Stars (West) in 1920. He also played in the Cuban League for the Habana and Almendares clubs between 1918 and 1922, including three separate stints at Habana, and then played in the Cuban League again in 1927 for the short-lived Team Cuba. López also played for seven different teams in minor league baseball (in which he was listed as "Joe Lopez") in the 1920s, including the Columbus Senators and the Waco Cubs.
