= José Eduardo López =

Mexican boxer (born 1990)

Personal information
- Nickname: Piston
- Born: José Eduardo López Rodríguez; 20 December 1990 (age 35) Torreón, Coahuila, Mexico
- Height: 1.76 m (5 ft 9 in)
- Weight: Welterweight; Light welterweight

Boxing career
- Stance: Orthodox

Boxing record
- Total fights: 26
- Wins: 22
- Win by KO: 13
- Losses: 3
- Draws: 1
- No contests: 0

José Eduardo López Rodríguez (born 20 December 1990) is a Mexican professional boxer in the Light Welterweight division.

== Professional career ==
On 21 May 2011 López upset prospect Jorge Páez, Jr. at the San Martín Texmelucan de Labastida in Puebla, Mexico.
