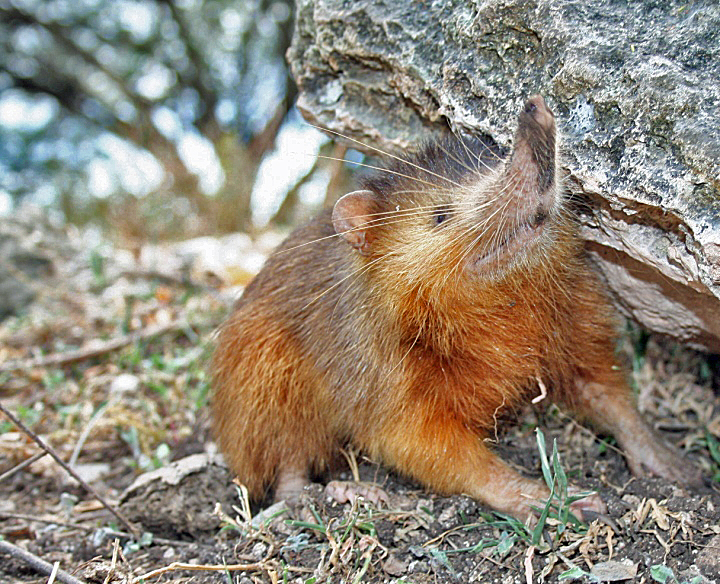
- Hispaniolan solenodon

Scientific classification
- Kingdom: Animalia
- Phylum: Chordata
- Class: Mammalia
- Infraclass: Placentalia
- Order: Eulipotyphla
- Family: Solenodontidae; Gill, 1872

Type genus
- Solenodon Brandt, 1833

Genera
- Atopogale; Solenodon
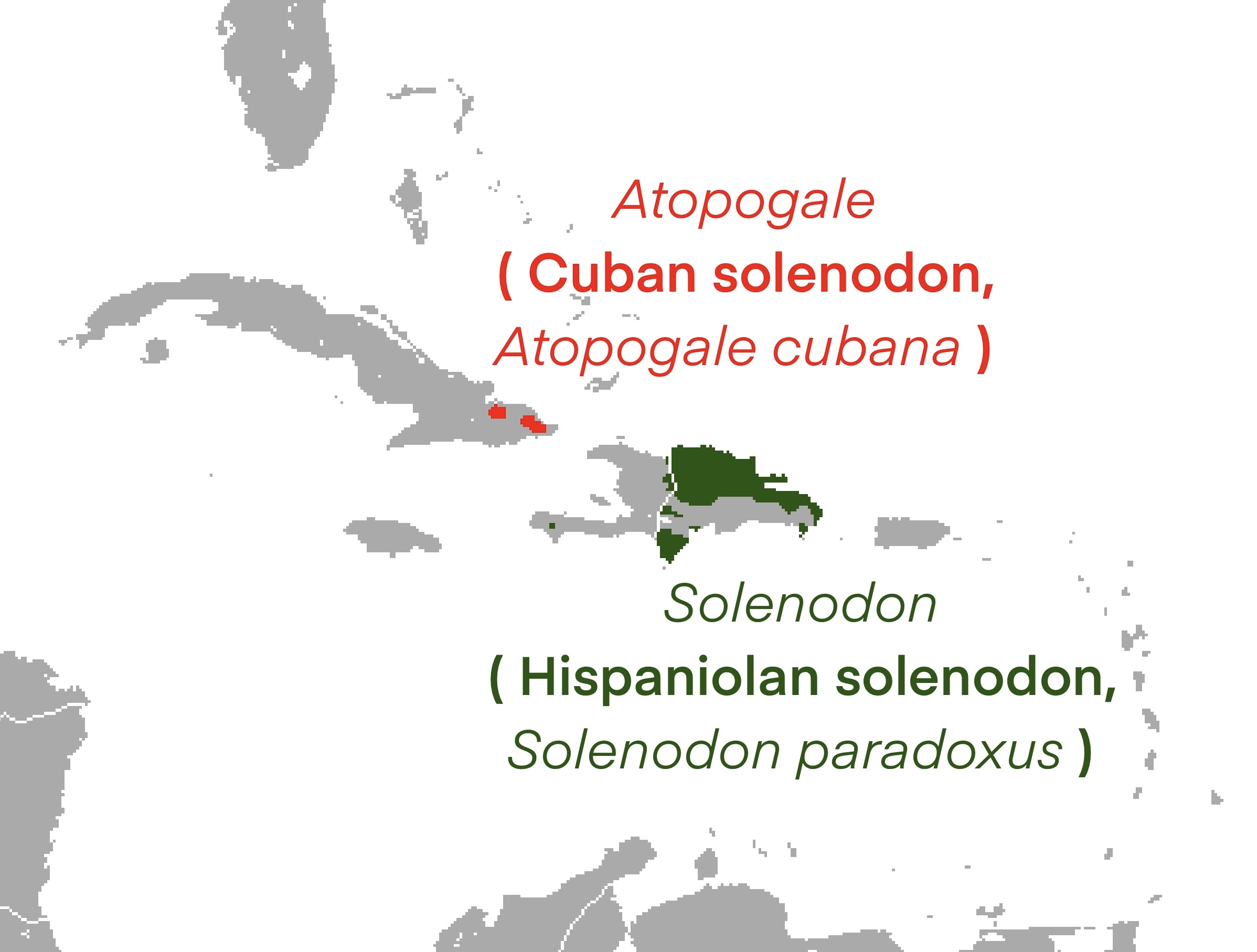

= Solenodon =

Solenodons Temporal range: Pleistocene–Recent

Family of mammals

Solenodons (/soʊˈlɛnədɒnz/; from Ancient Greek σωλήν (sōlḗn), meaning "channel, pipe", and ὀδούς (odoús), meaning "tooth") are venomous, nocturnal, burrowing, insectivorous mammals belonging to the family Solenodontidae /soʊˌlɛnəˈdɒntɪdiː/. The two living solenodon species are the Cuban solenodon (Atopogale cubana) and the Hispaniolan solenodon (Solenodon paradoxus). Threats to both species include habitat destruction and predation by non-native cats, dogs, and mongooses, introduced by humans to the solenodons' home islands to control snakes and rodents.

The Hispaniolan solenodon covers a wide range of habitats on the island of Hispaniola from lowland dry forest to highland pine forest. Two other described species became extinct during the Quaternary period. Oligocene North American genera, such as Apternodus, have been suggested as relatives of Solenodon, but the origins of the animal remain obscure.

== Taxonomy ==
Two genera, Atopogale and Solenodon, are known, each with one extant species. Other genera have been erected, but are now regarded as junior synonyms. Solenodontidae show retention of primitive mammal characteristics. In 2016, solenodons were confirmed by genetic analysis as belonging to an evolutionary branch that split from the lineage leading to hedgehogs, moles, and shrews before the Cretaceous-Paleogene extinction event. They are one of two families of Caribbean soricomorphs. The other family, Nesophontidae, became extinct during the Holocene. Molecular data suggest they diverged from solenodons roughly 57 million years ago. The solenodon is estimated to have diverged from other living mammals about 73 million years ago.

=== Extant species ===
Image	Scientific name	Common name	Distribution	Status
	Solenodon paradoxus	Hispaniolan solenodon	Hispaniola (the Dominican Republic and Haiti)	LC
	Atopogale cubana	Cuban solenodon	Cuba	EN

In addition, two extinct species, the giant solenodon (S. arredondoi) and Marcano's solenodon (S. marcanoi) are both thought to have gone extinct during the last 500 years, both presumably due to predation by introduced rats.

== Characteristics ==
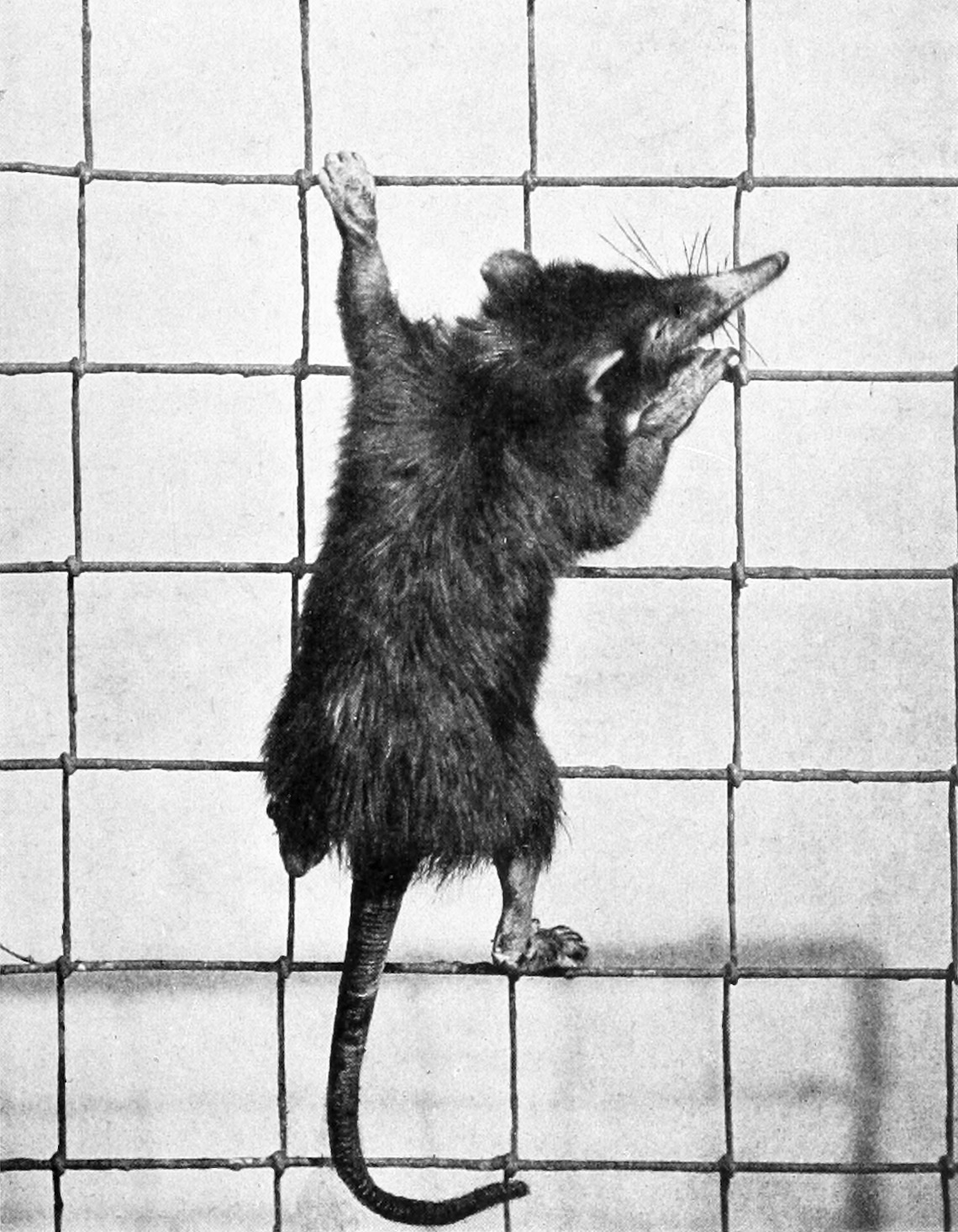
Cuban solenodon at New York Zoo

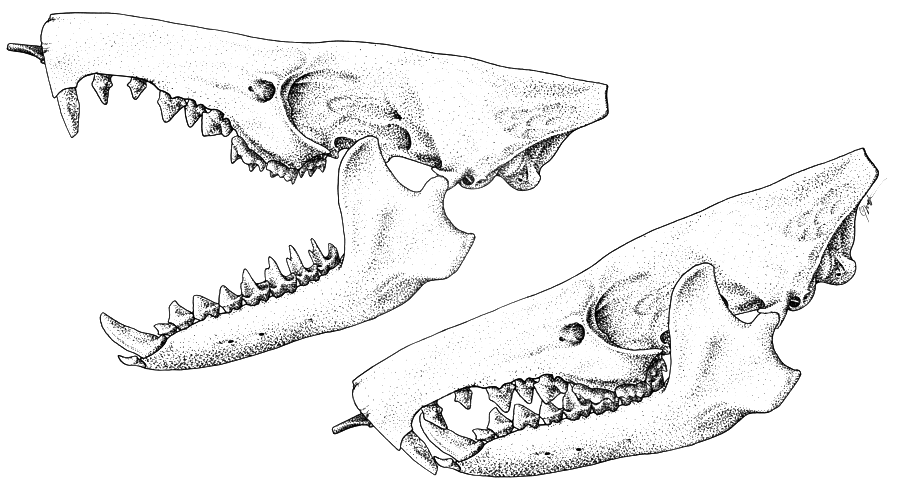
Skull of Solenodon paradoxus

Traditionally, solenodons' closest relatives were considered to be the giant water shrew of Africa and Tenrecidae of Madagascar, though they are now known to be more closely related to true shrews (Eulipotyphla). Solenodons resemble very large shrews, and are often compared to them; with extremely elongated cartilaginous snouts, long, naked, scaly tails, hairless feet, and small eyes. The Cuban solenodon is generally smaller than its Hispaniolan counterpart. It is also a rusty brown with black on its throat and back. The Hispaniolan solenodon is a darker brown with yellowish tint to the face. The snout is flexible and, in the Hispaniolan solenodon, actually has a ball-and-socket joint at the base to increase its mobility. This allows the animal to investigate narrow crevices where potential prey may be hiding.

Solenodons are also noted for the glands in their inguinal and groin areas that secrete what is described as a musky, goat-like odor. Solenodons range from 28 to 32 cm (11 to 13 in) from nose to rump, and weigh between 0.7 and 1.0 kg (1.5 and 2.2 lb).

Solenodons have a few unusual traits, one of them being the position of the two teats on the female, almost on the buttocks of the animal, and another being the venomous saliva that flows from modified salivary glands in the mandible through grooves on the second lower incisors ("solenodon" derives from the Greek "grooved tooth"). Solenodons are among a handful of venomous mammals. Fossil records show that some other now-extinct mammal groups also had the dental venom delivery system, indicating that the solenodon's most distinct characteristic may have been a more general ancient mammalian characteristic that has been lost in most modern mammals and is only retained in a couple of very ancient lineages. The solenodon has often been called a "living fossil" because it has endured virtually unchanged for the past 76 million years.

It is not known exactly how long solenodons can live in the wild. However, certain individuals of the Cuban species have been recorded to have lived for up to five years in captivity and individuals of the Hispaniolan species for up to eleven years.

West Indian natives have long known about the venomous character of the solenodon bite. Early studies on the nature of the tiny mammal's saliva suggested that it was very similar to the neurotoxic venom of certain snakes. More recently, the venom has been found to be related to that of the northern short-tailed shrew and it is mostly composed of kallikreins KLK1, serine proteases that prevent blood clotting, cause hypotension and ultimately end up being fatal to the prey. The KLK1 in solenodon venom is very similar to serine protease found in venomous snakes like vipers, and has evolved in parallel in both lineages from an ancient toxin precursor. Solenodons create venom in enlarged submaxillary glands, and only inject venom through their bottom set of teeth. The symptoms of a solenodon bite include general depression, breathing difficulty, paralysis, and convulsions; large enough doses have resulted in death in lab studies on mice.

Their diets consist largely of insects, earthworms, and other invertebrates, but they also eat vertebrate carrion, and perhaps even some living vertebrate prey, such as small reptiles or amphibians. They have also been known to feed on fruits, roots, and vegetables. Based on observation of the solenodon in captivity, they have only been known to drink while bathing. Solenodons have a relatively unspecialised, and almost complete dentition, with a dental formula of: 3.1.3.33.1.3.3.

Solenodons find food by sniffing the ground until they come upon their prey. If the prey is small enough, the solenodon will consume it immediately. After coming across the prey, the solenodon will bring the forelimbs up to either side of the prey and then move the head forward, opening the jaw and properly catching its prey. While sniffing for food, the solenodon can get through physical barriers with the help of its sharp claws.

There has been research that suggests that males and females of the two species have different eating habits. The female has a habit of scattering the food to make sure that no morsel of food is missed as it is foraging. The male was noted to use its tongue to lap up the food and using the lower jaw as a scoop. However, these specimens were studied in captivity, so these habits may not be found in the wild.

== Reproduction ==
Solenodons give birth in a nesting burrow to one or two young. The young remain with the mother for several months and initially follow the mother by hanging on to her elongated teats. Once they reach adulthood solenodons are solitary animals and rarely interact except to breed.

The reproductive rate of solenodons is relatively low. A female produces only two litters of one or two pups each per year. Breeding can occur at any time. Males will not aid in the care for the young. The mother will give birth in a burrow or den. Her offspring cling to her two nipples, which are placed toward the back of the animal. If the litter consists of three offspring, one will become malnourished and die. The nursing period lasts for approximately seventy-five days.

== Behavior ==
Solenodons make their homes in bushy areas in forests. During the daytime they seek refuge in caves, burrows, or hollow logs. They are easily provoked and can fly into a frenzy of squealing and biting with no warning. They run and climb quite fast, despite only ever touching the ground with toes. Solenodons are said to give off grunts similar to that of a pig or bird-call when feeling threatened.

Solenodons generate clicking noises similar to those of shews; the sound waves bounce off objects in their vicinity. This form of echolocation helps a solenodon navigate as well as find food. This well developed auditory ability combined with its above average sense of smell helps the solenodon survive despite its extremely small eyes and poor vision.

Solenodons have been described as both omnivorous and insectivorous. Their natural diet largely consists of insects including ants and roaches, grubs, vegetation, and fruit. However, they have also been observed to eat small vertebrates like mice and chicks, meat of large animals, as well as animal products such as eggs and milk, when fed these food items in captivity.

== Status ==
=== Cuba ===
The Cuban solenodon is considered Endangered due to predation by the small Indian mongoose (Urva auropunctata), which was introduced in colonial times to hunt snakes and rats, as well as by feral cats and dogs. The Cuban solenodon was thought to have been extinct until a live specimen was found in 2003.

=== Haiti ===
The Hispaniolan solenodon was also once thought to be extinct, more due to its secretive and elusive behavior than to low population numbers. Recent studies have proven that the species is widely distributed through the island of Hispaniola, but it does not tolerate habitat degradation. A 1981 study of the Hispaniolan solenodon in Haiti found that the species was "functionally extinct", with the exception of a small population in the area of Massif de la Hotte. A follow-up study, in 2007, noted that the solenodon was still thriving in the area, even though the region has had an increase in human population density in recent years.

=== Dominican Republic ===
The Sierra de Bahoruco, a mountain range in the southwest of the Dominican Republic that straddles the border with Haiti, was examined by conservation teams looking for solenodons. The work occurred during the day when the animals were asleep in burrows so that they could be viewed with an infrared camera. When researchers search for solenodons in daylight, they look for the following clues to their presence:

- nearby nose-poke holes that the creatures make in the ground with their long noses to probe the earth, as they look for insects they can hunt and eat. After a relatively long period of time they will be covered in leaves, but a fresh hole will be covered in moist soil.
- nearby scratches in logs that were made with their long claws.
- a strong musty goat-like smell seeping out of a burrow. The pungent odor indicates that the burrow is active, and a solenodon may be present sleeping.

A solenodon was captured in 2008 during a month-long expedition in the Dominican Republic, thereby allowing researchers the rare opportunity to examine it in daylight. The Durrell Wildlife Conservation Trust and the Ornithological Society of Hispaniola were able to take measurements and DNA from the creature before it was released. It was the only trapping made from the entire month-long expedition. The new information gathered was significant because little information was known about the solenodon's ecology, behavior, population status, and genetics, and without that knowledge it is difficult for researchers to design effective conservation. In a 2020 assessment from the IUCN, the Hispaniolan solenodon was found to be much more common on Hispaniola than previously thought, warranting its downlisting from "Endangered" to a "Least Concern" species.

== Conservation ==
After the arrival of Europeans to the Caribbean, the existence of both species of solenodon has been threatened by introduced species, like dogs, cats, rats, and mongooses, as well as more dense human settlement. These factors were possibly the catalyst for the relatively recent extinction of two species, the giant solenodon (S. arredondoi) and the Marcano's solenodon (S. marcanoi). Native snakes and birds of prey are also threats.

Solenodons have no known negative effects on human populations; in fact, they serve as both pest control, helping ecosystems by keeping down the population of invertebrates, and a means of spreading fruit seeds. Human activity has also had an adverse effect on the solenodon population. Human development on both Cuba and Hispaniola has resulted in fragmentation and habitat loss, further contributing to the reduction of the solenodon's range and numbers.

== See also ==
- List of eulipotyphlans of the Caribbean
