= Halmos College of Natural Sciences and Oceanography =

Nova Southeastern University Halmos College of Natural Sciences and Oceanography
- Type: Private research university
- Location: Hollywood, Florida, United States; 26°5′26.5″N 80°6′40.″W
- Campus: Suburban; 10 acres (0.040 km^{2})
- Website: cnso.nova.edu

The Halmos College of Natural Sciences and Oceanography is a natural science college at Nova Southeastern University in Florida. The college offers programs in subjects like biology and mathematics and conducts oceanographical research.

== Degree Programs ==
The college offers multiple bachelor's, master's and doctoral programs.

- B.S. in Biology
- B.S. in Chemistry
- B.S. in Marine Biology
- B.S. in Mathematics
- B.S. in Environmental Science/Studies
- M.S. in Biological Sciences
- M.S. in Marine Science
- Ph.D. in Marine Biology/Oceanography

== Facilities ==
The college has a presence at two campuses: in the Parker Building on the Fort Lauderdale/Davie Campus, and the Oceanographic Center, located on a 10-acre (40,000 m^{2}) site on the ocean side of Port Everglades, adjacent to the port's entrance. The center has a 1-acre (4,000 m^{2}) boat basin and affords immediate access to the Gulf Stream, the Florida Straits, and the Bahama Banks. The center is composed of three buildings, and several modulars. The main two-story building houses seven laboratories, conference rooms, workroom, and 13 offices. A second building contains a large two-story warehouse and staging area, classroom, biology laboratory, electron microscopy laboratory, darkroom, machine shop, carpentry shop, electronics laboratory, the library, student computer lab, computing center, and 15 offices. A one-story building contains a wetlab/classroom, coral workshop, and an X-ray facility. A modular laboratory is used for aquaculture studies. The Oceanographic Center grows and sells red mangroves.

== Affiliated institutions ==
=== National Coral Reef Institute ===
The Oceanographic Center is host to the National Coral Reef Institute was established by Congressional mandate in 1998. NCRI's primary objective is the assessment, monitoring, and restoration of coral reefs through basic and applied research and through training and education.

=== Guy Harvey Research Institute ===
The Guy Harvey Research Institute conducts basic and applied scientific research needed for effective conservation, biodiversity maintenance, restoration, and understanding of the world's wild fishes. The GHRI also provides scientific training to US and international students interested in ocean health. The GHRI is named for Jamaican artist Guy Harvey known for his marine themed works.

== Broward County, Florida Sea Turtle Conservation ==
The college supplies the Broward County Sea Turtle Conservation Program with contract employees and research facilities.
