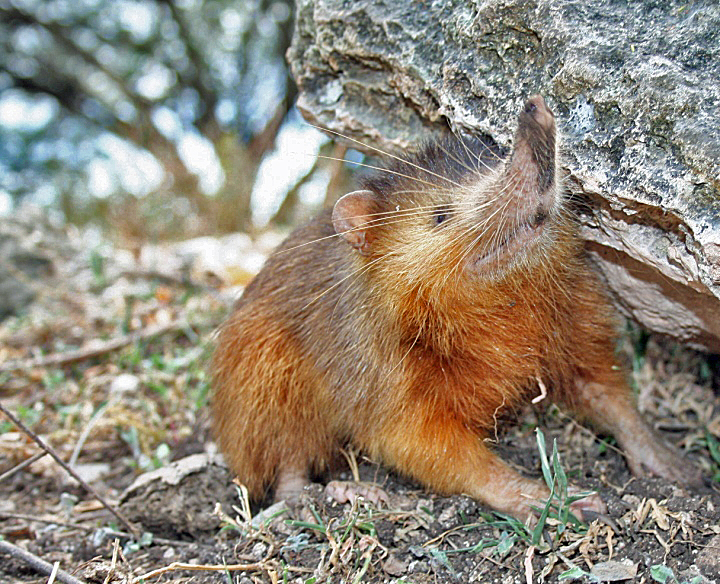

Conservation status
- Least Concern (IUCN 3.1)

Scientific classification
- Kingdom: Animalia
- Phylum: Chordata
- Class: Mammalia
- Order: Eulipotyphla
- Family: Solenodontidae
- Genus: Solenodon
- Species: S. paradoxus

Binomial name
- Solenodon paradoxus Brandt, 1833
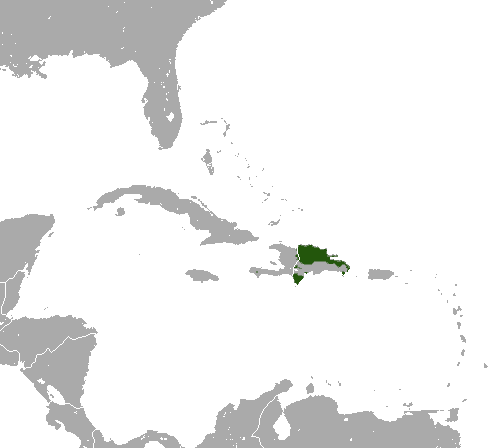
- Hispaniolan solenodon range (brown)

Synonyms
- Solenodon woodi (Ottenwalder, 2001)

= Hispaniolan solenodon =

Species of mammal endemic to Hispaniola

The Hispaniolan solenodon (Solenodon paradoxus), also known as the agouta, is a small, furry, shrew-like mammal endemic to the Caribbean island of Hispaniola (in the Dominican Republic and Haiti). Like other solenodons, it is a venomous, insect-eating animal that lives in burrows and is active at night. It is an elusive animal and was only first described in 1833; its numbers are stable in protected forests but it remains the focus of conservation efforts.

Its smaller sister species of the same genus, Marcano's solenodon (S. marconoi) became extinct after European colonization. The Hispaniolan solenodon and the rat-like Hispaniolan hutia live in the same habitats and are the only surviving mammals native to the island.

== Discovery ==
In 1833 the Russian Academy of Sciences received a new specimen from Haiti. Puzzled by the animal, curator Johann Friedrich von Brandt named it Solenodon paradoxus. (Solenodon means "grooved teeth".) No more information was known other than a relation to the Cuban solenodon (Atopogale cubana) discovered in 1861, and it was believed to be extinct. Addison Emery Verrill and Alpheus Hyatt Verrill rediscovered the animal in the Dominican Republic in 1907, but by 1964 it was again believed extinct.

== Description ==
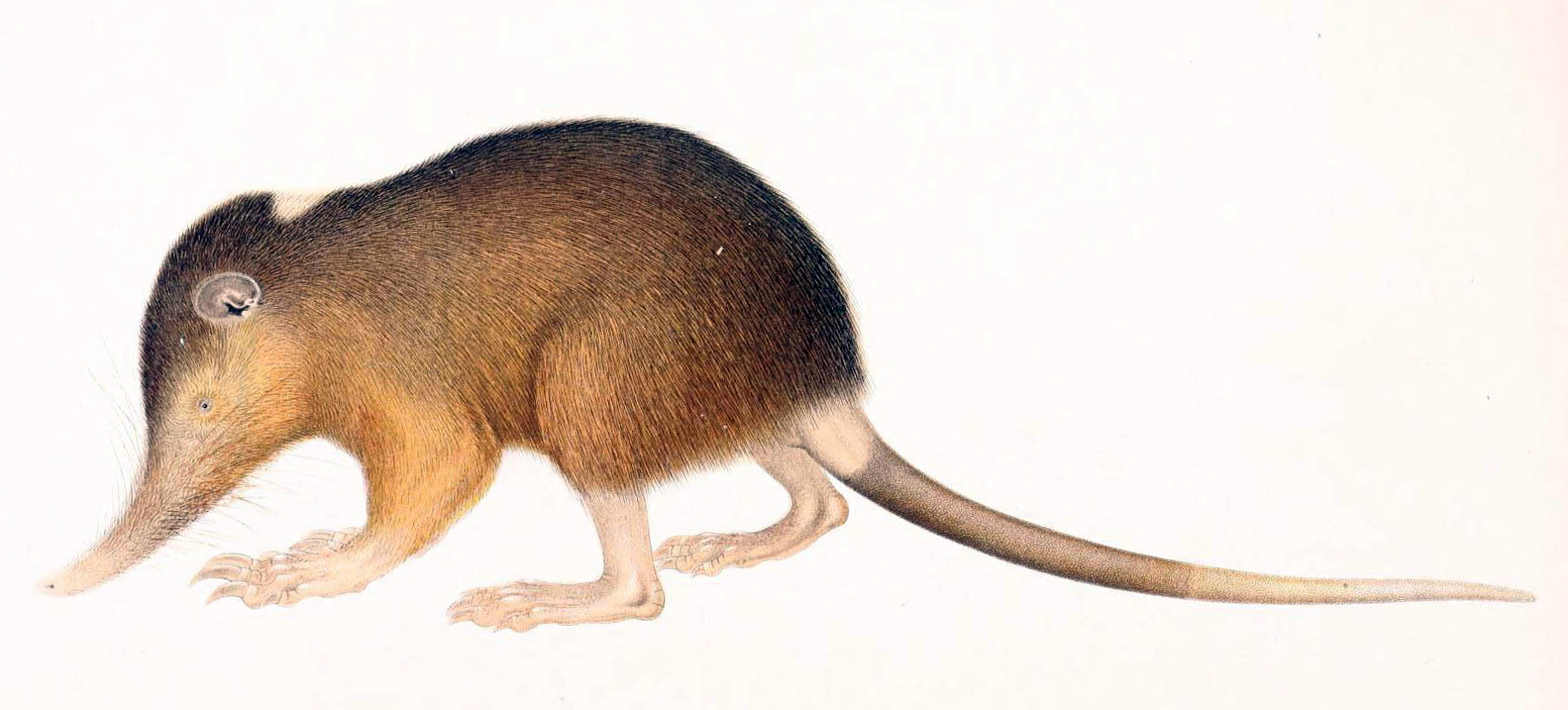
Illustration

The Hispaniolan solenodon resembles an oversized shrew; males and females are similar in size. Adults measure 49 to 72 cm (19 to 28 in) in total length, including a tail 20 to 25 cm (7.9 to 9.8 in) long, and weigh about 800 g (28 oz) on average. This makes them the largest extant members of the Soricomorpha. Although they are somewhat variable in colour, they are typically dusky brown over most of the body, with a paler underside and reddish fur on the sides of the head, throat, and upper chest. The tail, legs, snout, and eyelids are hairless.

The forelegs are noticeably more developed than the hind legs, but all have strong claws useful for digging. The head is large in relation to its body, with a long rostrum and tiny eyes and ears partially hidden by the body fur. The nostrils open to the side and the snout has about a dozen long whiskers, up to 7 cm (2.8 in) in length, with a few smaller whiskers further back on the head. A unique feature is the os proboscidis, a bone extending forward from the nasal opening to support the snout cartilage; this is not found even in other solenodons.

The dental formula for the species is 3.1.3.33.1.3.3 × 2 = 40. The second lower incisor has a narrow tubular channel that is almost entirely enclosed, through which flows a venomous saliva secreted by the submaxillary gland. Although the exact chemical composition of the venom is unknown, injection of 0.38 to 0.55 mg of venom per gram of body mass has been shown to be fatal to mice in two to six minutes.

Hispaniolan solenodons have patches of skin rich in apocrine glands on the thighs. The secretions of these glands are used in communication between individuals.

== Distribution and habitat ==
Hispaniolan solenodons are found only on the island of Hispaniola, in the Dominican Republic and parts of southern Haiti. Their habitat is usually undisturbed moist forest below 1,000 m (3,300 ft) elevation, although they are sometimes found at higher altitudes or close to developed agricultural land. There are two recognised subspecies:

- Solenodon paradoxus paradoxus – northern Dominican Republic
- Solenodon paradoxus woodi – far southern Dominican Republic and Haiti, Tiburon Peninsula

The Hispaniolan solenodon appears to have a patchy distribution. Populations are found both within and outside protected areas such as the Jaragua, Del Este and Sierra de Baoruco National Parks. In Haiti, it is reported from La Visite National Park and the Duchity region of the Massif de la Hotte. Its presence in Los Haitises National Park in the Dominican Republic is inferred, but unconfirmed.

== Behavior ==
Hispaniolan solenodons are nocturnal; during daylight hours, they stay in their burrows, trees, hollowed-out logs or caves, remaining hidden from view. Their burrows may contain multiple chambers and tunnels and are typically inhabited by an adult pair accompanied by up to six younger family members. When they emerge into the open air, they run on the soles of their feet, following an erratic, zigzag course.

Hispaniolan solenodons feed mainly on arthropods, such as millipedes (Julida), ground beetles, and various blattodean & orthopteran insects (Gryllidae, Tettigoniidae, and Blattidae), but will also eat worms, snails, mice, and small reptiles; they may also feed on a small amount of fruit, grains, and leaf litter. They probe the earth with their snouts and dig or rip open rotten logs with their claws. They have been reported to make a number of vocalisations, including a loud defensive "chirp", an aggressive "squeal", a soft "squeak" when encountering familiar conspecifics, and a high-pitched "clic" when encountering strangers. They have also been reported to make echolocation clicks at 9 to 31 kHz.

== Reproduction ==
Breeding occurs throughout the year, although the females are receptive only for short periods once every ten days or so. Litters of one to three young are born after a gestation period of over 84 days. Usually, only two of the offspring survive, because the female only has two teats, which are found towards the groin. The young are born blind and hairless, and weighing 40 to 55 g (1.4 to 1.9 oz). They are carried about by the mother for the first two months of life, although it is unknown how long it takes for them to be fully weaned. They can live for over eleven years in captivity.

== Ecology ==
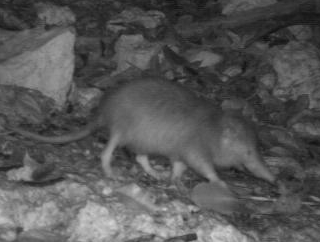
A specimen in the wild

The Hispaniolan solenodon is preyed upon by the ashy-faced owl (Tyto glaucops) and the Stygian owl (Asio stygius). Because of a lack of natural land predators, the Hispaniolan solenodon did not evolve defenses, and it is a slow, clumsy runner. Feral dog and cat populations have become established, and small Asian mongooses (Urva auropunctata) were introduced to control rats in sugar cane fields; all three can potentially prey on solenodons.

== Evolution ==
In 2016, researchers at the University of Illinois and the University of Puerto Rico completely sequenced the mitochondrial genome of the Hispaniolan solenodon. The study confirmed that solenodons diverged from all other living mammals about 78 million years ago. The study also found that there is much greater genetic diversity among the northern population than the southern population. This timeline aligns well with a hypothesis on how the Hispaniolan solenodon came to inhabit the island of Hispaniola. Geologists speculate that the island was part of a volcanic arc that connected to Mexico around 75 million years ago.

== Genomic studies ==
The Hispaniolan solenodon is one of the few surviving members of a deeply divergent mammalian lineage that split from other placental mammals in the Late Cretaceous period. As such, it has attracted attention from evolutionary biologists and conservationists alike. Recent advances in genome sequencing have provided crucial insights into its phylogeny, venom evolution, and genetic diversity. Sequencing whole genomes of six captured individuals predicts that solenodons diverged from other extant mammals 73.6 million years ago.

=== Genome assembly and annotation ===
In 2018, a landmark study reported the first nuclear genome assembly for S. paradoxus using a novel assembly strategy tailored to its low heterozygosity and endangered status. The study used pooled sequencing of five individuals from the southern subspecies (S. p. woodi) to increase effective coverage and adopted a string graph-based assembler, Fermi, for contig construction. This approach proved superior to de Bruijn graph-based assembly for highly homozygous genomes, producing a high-quality draft with 86% BUSCO gene completeness at the contig level and 91% after scaffolding.

The final genome was annotated for repetitive elements, protein-coding genes, and non-coding RNAs. Comparative genomic analysis revealed a genome size of approximately 2.06 Gbp, and an unusually low percentage of repetitive content (~22.5%) compared to other eulipotyphlans. Phylogenetic analysis based on 4,416 single-copy orthologs estimated the divergence of solenodons from other placental mammals approximately 73.6 million years ago, supporting their basal phylogenetic position.

A second assembly of the S. paradoxus genome was made specifically for the identification of the proteins present in its venom. The S. paradoxus genome was constructed using high molecular weight DNA isolated from the blood of a captive male adult individual from ZOODOM. Paired-end library sequencing was performed on an Illumina HiSeq 2500 instrument with 250-bp reads. The assembly was undertaken using DISCOVAR de novo, before annotation with MAKER, with Augustus implemented to facilitate gene prediction.

=== Subspecies divergence and conservation units ===
Mitochondrial genome sequencing and phylogeographic analyses have shown a clear genetic division between northern (S. p. paradoxus) and southern (S. p. woodi) populations of Solenodon paradoxus. These subspecies likely diverged during Pleistocene climate oscillations, with a demographic split estimated at least 300,000 years ago. Whole-genome demographic modeling confirmed this division, showing that the northern population maintained a larger effective population size in recent millennia. These data support treating the two subspecies as distinct conservation units.

The whole genome single-nucleotide polymorphism (SNP) variation between northern and southern captured individuals enabled the researchers to infer population demography, and supported a likely subspecies split (S. paradoxus woodi the proposed name for the southern subspecies) within the Hispaniolan solenodon at least 300 thousand years ago.

=== Venom evolution ===
S. paradoxus is one of the few venomous placental mammals, delivering venom through grooves in its lower incisors. Genomic evidence suggests convergent evolution of venom in solenodons and venomous shrews. Among the most intriguing discoveries in the early assembly of the S. paradoxus genome was a unique 21-amino acid insertion in the solenodon coagulation factor X (F10). This insertion, located in a region typically cleaved during venom activation, may enhance venom functionality but requires biochemical validation. An independent analysis of venom-related gene families based on the second assembly of S. paradoxus genome, revealed expanded kallikrein-like and serine protease gene clusters in both groups, indicating parallel recruitment of similar genes for venom function.

== Conservation ==
Today, the solenodon is one of the last two surviving native insectivorous mammals found in the Caribbean, and one of the only two remaining endemic terrestrial mammal species of Hispaniola.

While the survival of the solenodon is uncertain, talk of conservation has been underway through the "Last Survivors Project", which has been collaborating with the Dominican government. In 2009, a five-year plan for conservation was funded, which has been put in place to conduct field research, discover the best means by which to bring about their conservation, and organize monitoring tools to ensure their long-term survival.

One of the conservation efforts' aims is to increase local awareness of the species, particularly in the Dominican Republic. The Ornithological Society of Hispaniola showed pictures of the solenodon to the locals in both countries, and few knew what they were due to their nocturnal nature. The Hispaniolan solenodon was identified as one of the top ten "focal species" in 2007 by the EDGE Species project. A collaborative conservation project funded by the Darwin Initiative (UK) was started in 2009 and is researching the species to conserve it. The species is fully protected by law. However, national parks in both Haiti and the Dominican Republic are threatened by deforestation and encroachment for farming and charcoal production. The US Agency for International Development and the Nature Conservancy are working with local nongovernmental organisations to improve protection and implement management plans for these parks (the "Parks in Peril" programme). A recovery plan for the isolated Haitian population, published in 1992, advocated comprehensive surveys, improved management of the Pic Macaya National Park, education campaigns, control of exotic mammals, and an ex situ breeding programme. These recommendations have not yet been implemented.

Two conservation research and education programmes funded by the Darwin Initiative have recently been established, focusing on solenodons in both countries: "Building evidence and capacity to conserve Hispaniola's endemic land mammals" (started 2009), and "Building a future for Haiti's unique vertebrates" (started 2010). These collaborative projects represent a partnership between the EDGE Programme, the Durrell Wildlife Conservation Trust, BirdLife International, the Sociedad Ornitologica de la Hispaniola, the Dominican Republic National Zoo, Societe Audubon Haiti, and in-country project partners.

Habitat loss and predation by introduced species have contributed to it being considered an endangered species in the past. It was considered almost extinct until 1907, when it was found living in the interior of Hispaniola. It was not considered to be in immediate danger early in the 20th century. In 1966, it was found in several localities in the Dominican Republic. In 1981, after extensive searching, the Hispaniolan solenodon was declared "functionally extinct" in Haiti, persisting only in the remote mountains of the south. In 1987, it was still found in both countries, but was thought to be particularly threatened in Haiti. As of 1996, it could still be found in both countries. Wildlife filmmaker Jürgen Hoppe has been able to film the Hispaniolan solenodon in various parts of the Dominican Republic during the last 18 years. The most recent sightings in the wild (with video evidence) were during the summer of 2008, when a team of researchers from the Durrell Wildlife Conservation Trust and the Ornithological Society of Hispaniola were able to trap an individual specimen. The researchers took physical measurements and DNA before releasing them back into the wild.

=== Conservation genetics tools ===
Due to its endangered status and cryptic behavior, genomic tools are essential for monitoring solenodon populations. Microsatellite loci identified from the genome assembly have been validated for use in both subspecies and deposited in public databases. These markers will aid in future studies of population structure, inbreeding, and effective population size, supporting targeted conservation strategies.

Solenodon paradoxus was listed as Endangered on the IUCN Red List due to ongoing threats such as habitat destruction, introduced predators, and restricted range. Genomic data now provide a foundation for conservation genomics efforts aimed at preserving this evolutionarily distinct mammal. The solenodon was recently downlisted to Least Concern by the IUCN in 2020, on the basis of an increased awareness of its population size and range.
