= Journal of Heredity =

Peer-reviewed scientific journal

- Discipline: Genetics
- Language: English
- Edited by: William Murphy

Publication details
- Former name: American Breeders' Magazine
- History: 1910–present
- Publisher: Oxford University Press on behalf of the American Genetic Association
- Frequency: 7/year
- Open access: Hybrid
- Impact factor: 2.645 (2020)

Standard abbreviations
- ISO 4: J. Hered.

Indexing
- CODEN: JOHEA8
- ISSN: 0022-1503 (print); 1465-7333 (web)
- LCCN: 11019964
- OCLC no.: 1782242

Links
- Journal homepage; Online access; Online archive

The Journal of Heredity is a peer-reviewed scientific journal concerned with heredity in a biological sense, covering all aspects of genetics. It is published by Oxford University Press on behalf of the American Genetic Association.

== History ==
The trends in topics that have been published in the journal reflect the history of the discipline of genetics. Early issues included many papers on eugenics, particularly under the editorial leadership of the journal's first two editors-in-chief, Paul Popenoe and R. C. Cook. Emphasis on eugenics in the journal declined throughout the 1940s and 1950s as support for the topic waned in the scientific community and the general public; when Cook's daughter, Barbara Kuhn, took over as editor in 1962 after her father's 40-year service, "...the subject of eugenics was essentially dropped."

Early topics of interest included comparative color inheritance in mammals (as explored in a series of articles that served as precursors to work applying enzyme kinetics to developmental genetics), determination of the number of human chromosomes, genetic histories of a number of types of livestock (including hybridization of cattle with American bison, the discovery of salivary chromosomes in Drosophila, and "A remarkable paper by Prokofyeva-Belgovskaya, pointing out a difference between mother and daughter chromosomes in binucleate cells. This foreshadowed modern work in intestinal tumors in which there are differences between cells containing the template DNA and those with copies."

== Editors-in-chief ==
The following persons have been editor-in-chief of the journal:

- Paul Popenoe (1913–1921)
- Robert C. Cook (1922–1962)
- Barbara Kuhn (1963–1986)
- Stephen J. O'Brien (1987–2007)
- C. Scott Baker (2007–2016)
- William Murphy (2017–present)

== Article types ==
The journal publishes articles in the following categories:

- Original Research
- Brief Communications
- Computer Notes
- Letters to the Editor

and on invitation:

- Reviews
- Perspectives
- Symposium Articles

== Abstracting and indexing ==
The journal is abstracted and indexed in:

- BIOSIS Previews
- Chemical Abstracts Service
- Current Contents/Life Sciences
- EMBASE
- Index Medicus/MEDLINE/PubMed
- Science Citation Index
