= American Genetic Association =

Professional scientific organization

- Formation: 1903; 123 years ago
- Type: professional scientific organization
- Location: United States
- Official language: English
- President: Michael Nachman
- Website: www.theaga.org

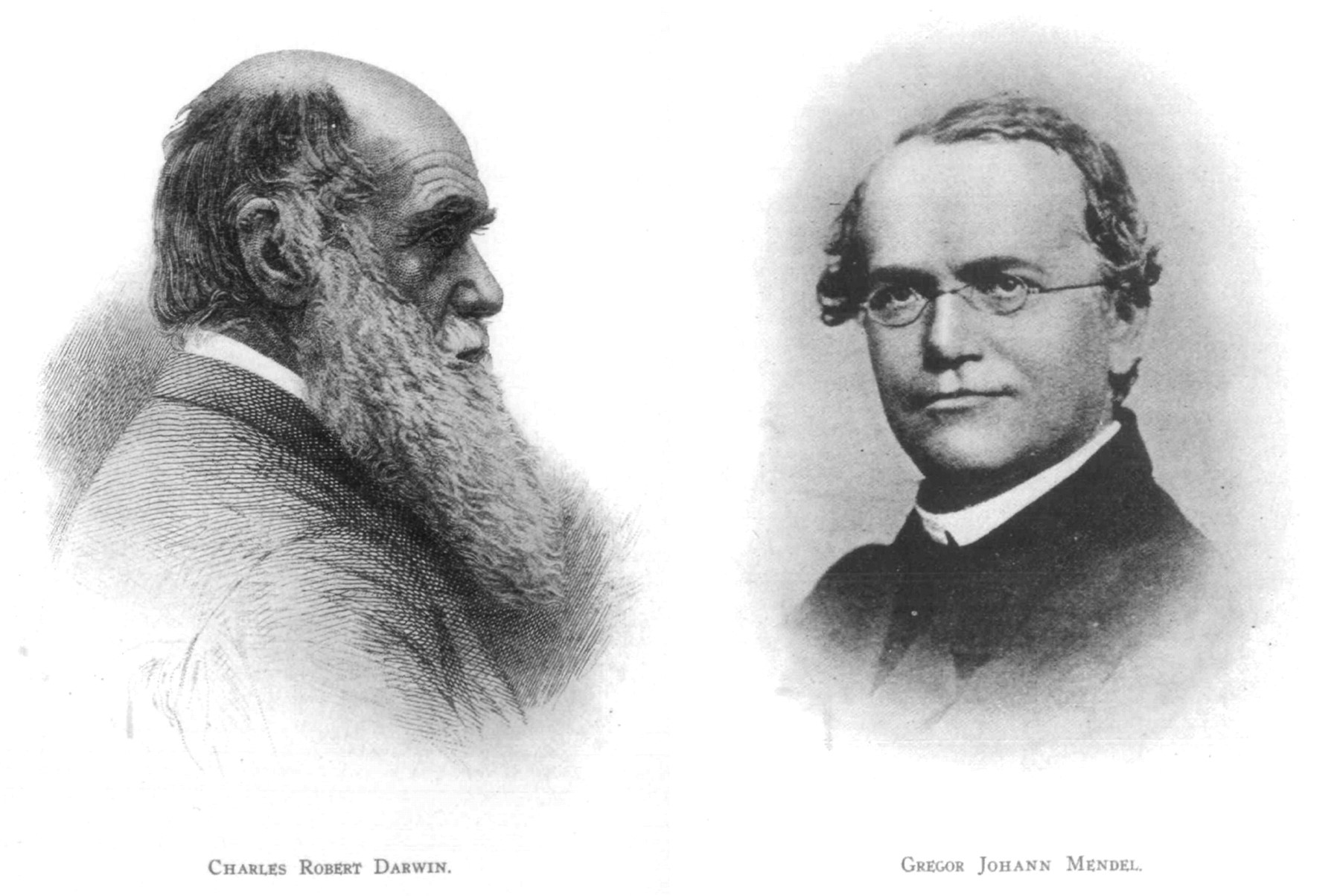
Original plates of Darwin and Mendel from Volume 1, Issue 1 of the American Breeders Magazine, 1910.

The American Genetic Association (AGA) is a US-based professional scientific organization dedicated to the study of genetics and genomics which was founded as the American Breeders Association in 1903. The association has published the Journal of Heredity since 1914, which disseminates peer-reviewed organismal research in areas of general interest to the genetics and genomics community. Recent articles have focused on conservation genetics of endangered species and biodiversity discovery, phylogenomics, molecular adaptation and speciation, and genotype to phenotype associations.

== History ==
The American Breeders Association held its first meeting in 1903 to discuss the "new" science of genetics that arose from Charles Darwin's theory of evolution and Gregor Mendel's discoveries of the laws of inheritance. The organization was established "to study the laws of breeding and to promote the improvement of plants and animals by the development of expert methods of breeding."

In 1914, the American Breeders Association broadened its scope and became the American Genetic Association. Today, the AGA's interests encompass evolutionary diversity and genomics across taxa and subject areas, including conservation genetics, phylogenetics, phylogeography, gene function, and the genetics of domestication. In 1965 it received a bequest from Wilhelmine Key to support a lecture series which bears her name.

The AGA disseminates progress in these fields through its publication, Journal of Heredity. It supports research and scholarship through sponsorship of an annual President's Symposium, special events awards, the Stephen J. O'Brien Award, and the Evolutionary, Ecological, or Conservation Genomics Research Awards.

The AGA is a 501(c)(3) corporation.

== Annual meeting ==
The American Genetic Association's annual conference, referred to as the President's Symposium, is organized by the AGA president for that year. In recent years, these meetings have focused on a relevant or emerging theme in non-human genetics and genomics research.

A special issue of the AGA's Journal of Heredity is devoted each year to publishing proceedings of the symposium. These special issues are available without a subscription from the AGA and Journal of Heredity websites.

== See also ==
- Conservation genetics
- Population genetics
- Evolutionary biology
