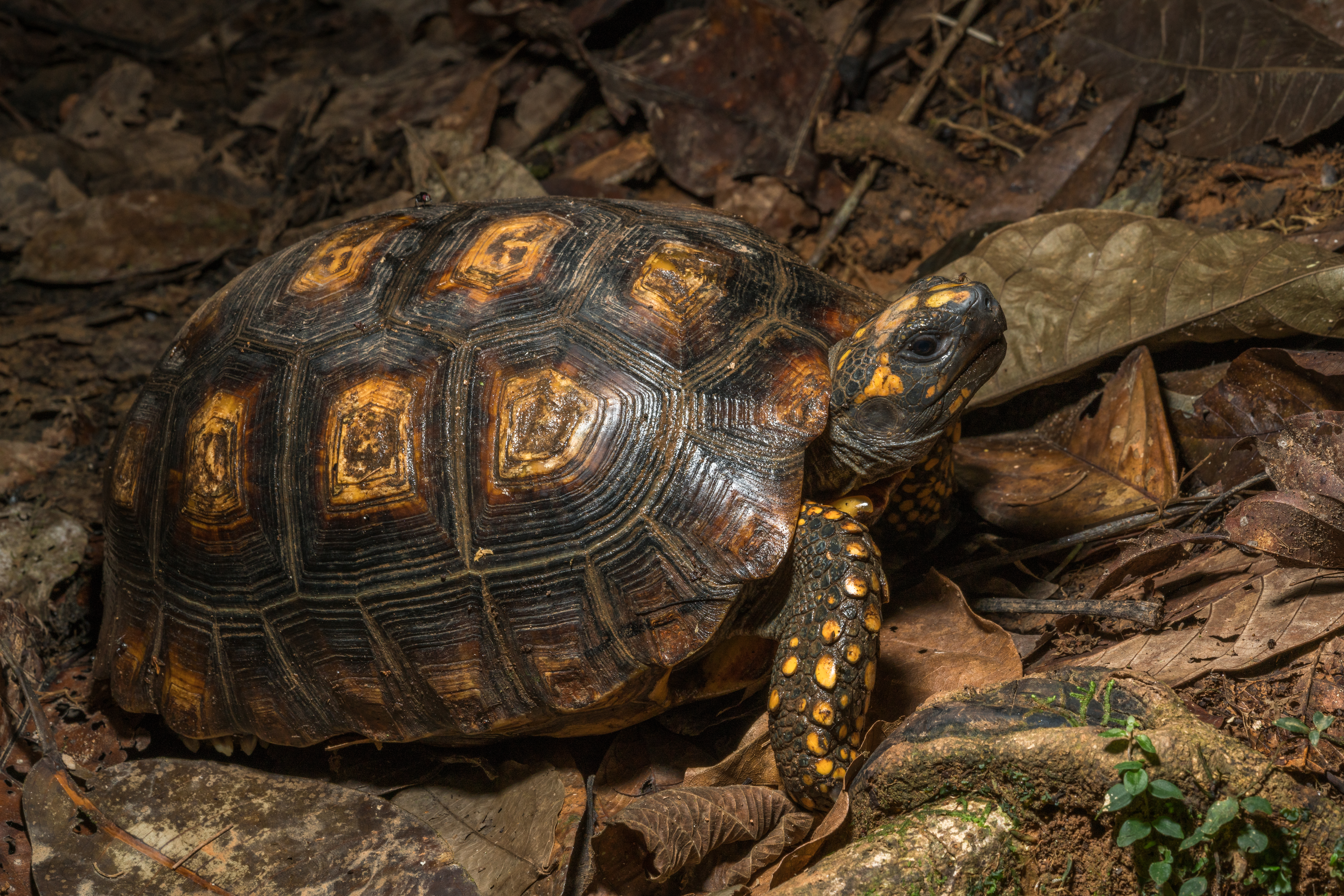
- Yellow-footed tortoise, Yasuni National Park, Ecuador

Conservation status
- Vulnerable (IUCN 3.1)

Scientific classification
- Kingdom: Animalia
- Phylum: Chordata
- Class: Reptilia
- Order: Testudines
- Suborder: Cryptodira
- Family: Testudinidae
- Genus: Chelonoidis
- Species: C. denticulatus

Binomial name
- Chelonoidis denticulatus (Linnaeus, 1766)

Synonyms
- Testudo denticulata Linneasus 1766; Testudo tabulata Walbaum, 1782(nomen illegitimum); Testudo tessellata Schneider, 1792; Testudo tabulata Schoepff, 1793; Testudo terrestris americana Schweigger, 1812; Testudo terrestris brasiliensis Schweigger, 1812; Testudo terrestris var. cayennensis Schweigger, 1812; Testudo terrestris surinamensis Schweigger, 1812; Chersine denticulata Merrem, 1820; Chersine tessellata Merrem, 1820; Testudo cagado Spix, 1824; Testudo hercules Spix, 1824; Testudo sculpta Spix, 1824; Chersine tabulata Gravenhorst, 1829; Testudo planata Gmelin, 1831 (nomen nudum); Testudo foveolata Schinz, 1833 (nomen nudum); Geochelone (Chelonoidis) tabulata Fitzinger, 1835; Geochelone (Geochelone) denticulata Fitzinger, 1835; Chelonoides tabulata Agassiz, 1857; Chelonoidis tabulata Agassiz, 1857; Chelonoidis denticulata Fróes, 1957; Chelonoides denticulata Obst, 1980; Geochelone denticulta Richard, 1999 (ex errore)

= Yellow-footed tortoise =

Species of reptile

The yellow-footed tortoise (Chelonoidis denticulatus), also known as the Brazilian giant tortoise, is a species of tortoise in the family Testudinidae and is closely related to the red-footed tortoise (C. carbonarius). It is found in the Amazon Basin of South America. The species name has often been misspelled as denticulata, an error introduced in the 1980s when Chelonoidis was elevated to genus and mistakenly treated as feminine, an error recognized and fixed in 2017.

With an average length of 40 cm (15.75 in) and the largest known specimen at 94 cm (37 in), this is the sixth-largest tortoise species on Earth, after the Galapagos tortoise, the Aldabra tortoise, the African spurred tortoise (Geochelone sulcata, typical size 76 cm (30 in)), the leopard tortoise (Stigmochelys pardalis), and the Asian forest tortoise (Manouria emys), typical size 60 cm (23.6 in)).

== Taxonomy ==
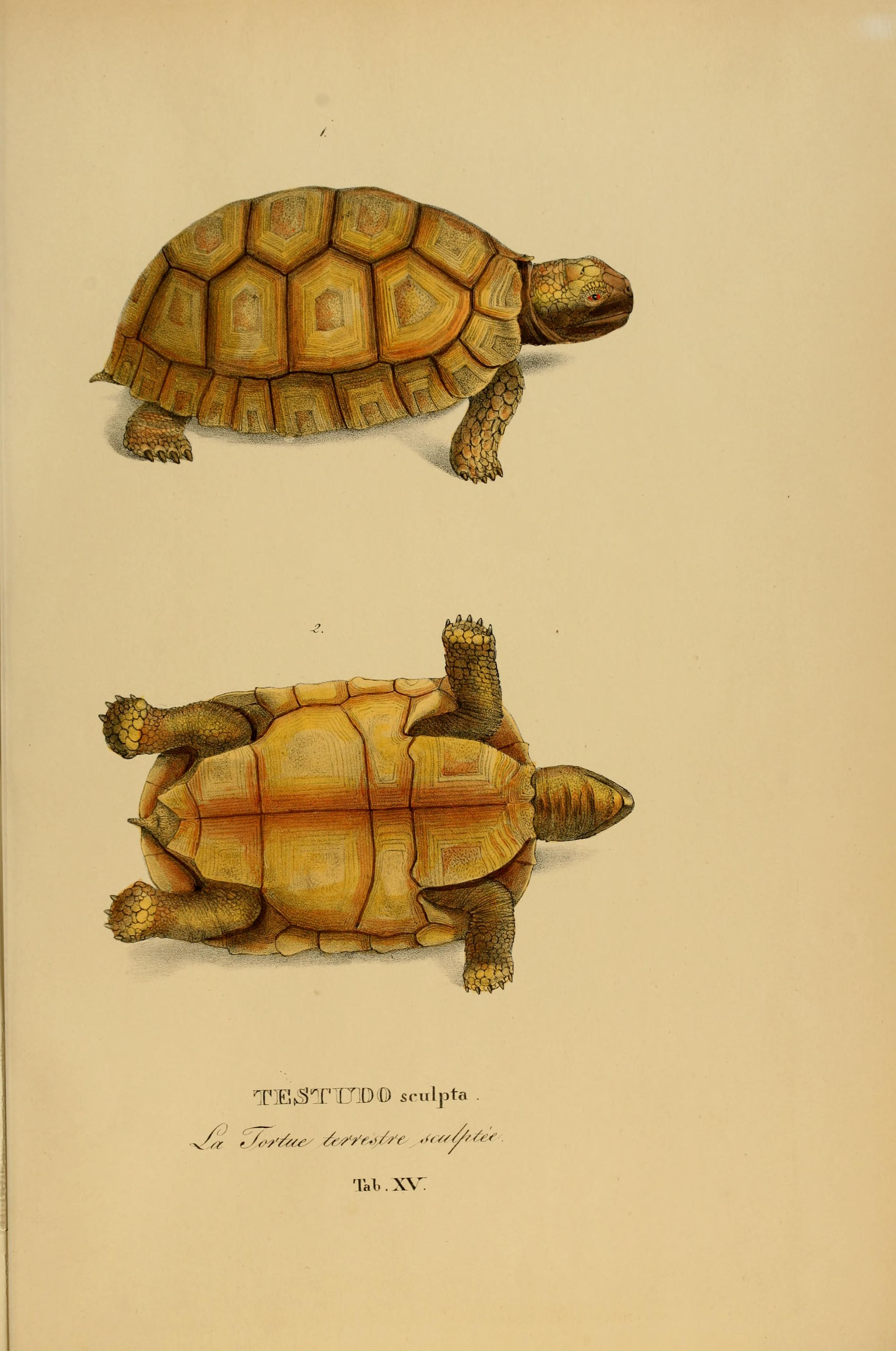
Illustration of C. denticulatus showing underside of shell

The yellow-footed tortoise is also called the yellow-foot or yellow-legged tortoise, the Brazilian giant tortoise, or South American forest tortoise, as well as local names such as jabuti-tinga, jabuti, morrocoy, woyamou or wayamo, or some variation of jabuta. Many of the local names are shared with the similar red-footed tortoise.

Originally, Carl Linnaeus assigned all turtles and tortoises to the genus Testudo and described this species as Testudo denticulata in 1766. Soon the term Testudo was only being used for tortoises as opposed to all chelonians, with tortoises defined by completely terrestrial behaviors, heavy shells, and elephant-like limbs with nails but no visible toes. The species got several other names, as well, for several reasons such as difficulty in distinguishing it from the red-footed, confusion over locations, researchers thinking they had discovered a new species in collections or in the field, etc.

Leopold Fitzinger created the genus Geochelone for medium-to-large tortoises that did not come from the Mediterranean area (which remained Testudo), or have other special characteristics such as the hinged shells of the genus Kinixys. Fitzinger further used the term Chelonoidis as a subgenus to categorize Geochelone from South America. Neither term was widely used until they were resurrected by researchers such as Williams in 1960.

Researchers such as Roger Bour and Charles Crumly separated Geochelone into different genera based largely on their skulls. They created or re-established several genera: Aldabrachelys, Astrochelys, Cylindraspis, Indotestudo, Manouria, and Chelonoidis. The debate is on-going over the definitions and validity of some of these genera. Chelonoidis is primarily defined as being from South America, lacking a nuchal scute (the marginal scute located over the neck) and a large, undivided supracaudal (the scute or scutes directly over the tail).

Chelonoidis is made up of two very different-looking groups: the C. carbonarius group with the yellow-footed and red-footed tortoises; and the C. chilensis group with the Galapagos tortoises (C. niger), and the Chaco tortoise (C. chilensis). The taxonomic and evolutionary relationship of these two groups is poorly understood.

== Physical characteristics and appearance ==
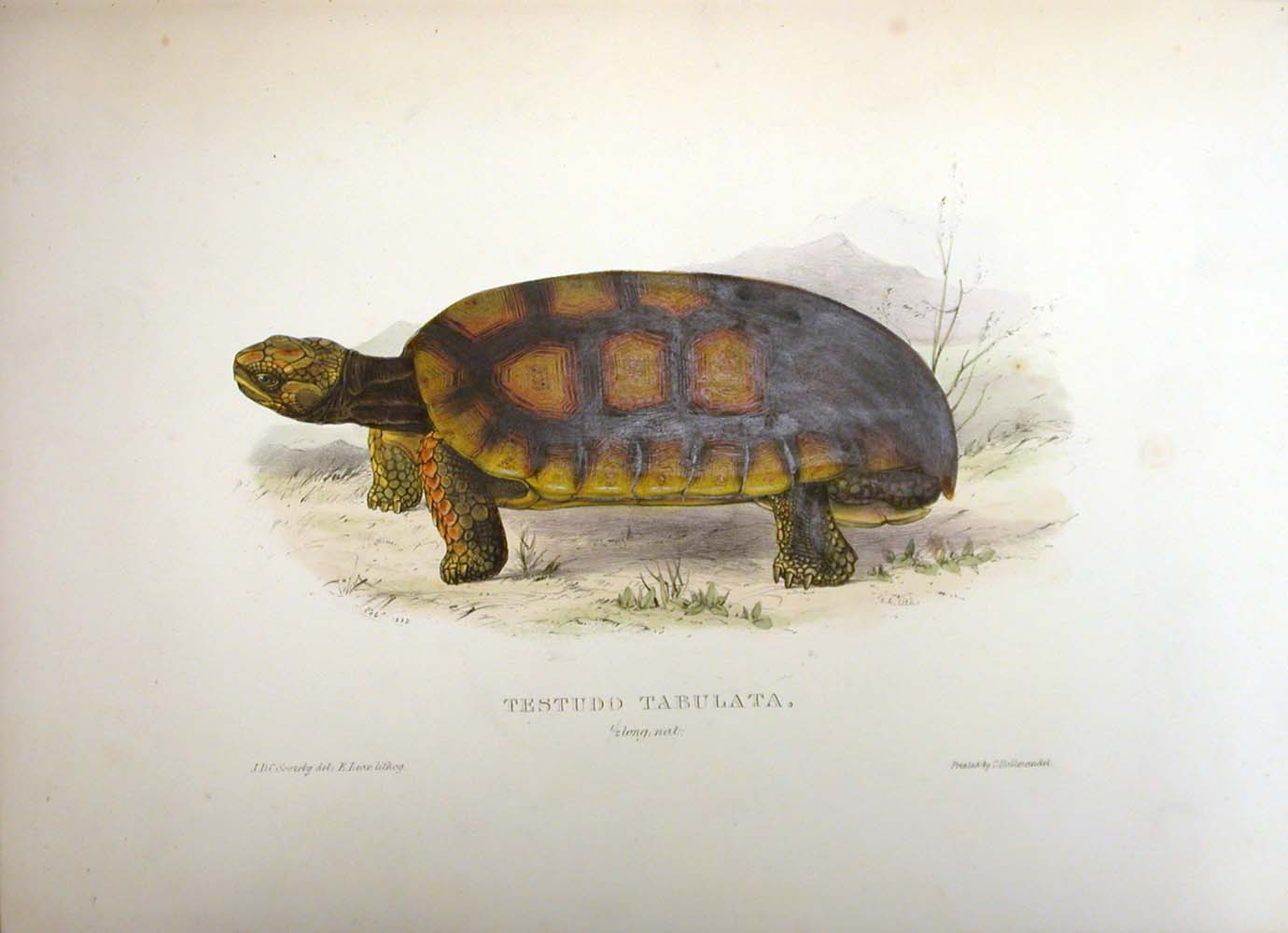
1830's drawing by James De Carle Sowerby

Yellow-footed tortoises are a large species – fifth-largest overall and third-largest mainland species, after the Aldabra giant tortoise (Aldabrachelys gigantea), Galapagos giant tortoise (Chelonoidis niger), African spurred tortoise, and Asian forest tortoise. Typical sizes average 40 cm (15.75 in), but much larger specimens are common. The largest known specimen is a female that was 94 cm (37 in) long. They closely resemble the red-footed tortoise, and can sometimes be difficult to tell apart, especially as a preserved specimen, which led to quite a bit of confusion over the names and ranges.

The carapace (shell top) is a long oval with parallel sides and a high-domed back that is generally flat along the vertebrals (scutes or shell scales along the top of the carapace) with a slight peak near the hind end. There are five vertebral scutes, four pairs of costals, eleven pairs of marginals, no nuchal scute (the marginal over the neck) and a large, undivided supracaudal (the marginals over the tail). The front and rear marginals (scutes along the edge of the carapace) are slightly serrated in front and rear of young yellow-footed tortoises. The carapace is yellowish brown to dark brown or even black at the edges of the scutes. The areola in each scute are pale yellow, orange or light brown and blend into the darker carapace.

The plastron (shell bottom) is thick around the edges, and the gulars (front pair of plastron scutes) do not project past the carapace. The plastron is yellow-brown turning nearly black near the seams.

The head is relatively small and longer than wide. The upper jaw has three tooth-like points. There are large black eyes with a tympanum behind each eye. The skin of the head and limbs is black with yellow to orange scales on top and around the eye and ear. The forelimbs have five claws, are long and slightly flattened. They are covered with fine, dark scales and slightly overlapping larger scales on front in the same color as the head. The hind limbs are elephant-like with four claws, and are covered in small scales colored like the forelimbs. The tail varies in length by gender and has a row of colored scales on the sides.

=== Sexual dimorphism ===
Adult males average slightly larger than females, but the largest specimens tend to be females. Males develop a distinctive incurving of sides, giving them a well-defined "waist", and a deeply in-curved plastron. The female has a short, conical tail, while the male has a longer, more muscular tail that is generally carried tucked along one side. The anal notch of the male is also larger, presumably to allow better tail mobility.

== Natural habitat ==
There is some disagreement as to which habitat is the preferred type for yellow-footed tortoises. Some feel they prefer grasslands and dry forest areas, and that rain-forest habitat is most likely marginal. Others suggest humid forest is the preferred habitat. Regardless, they are found in drier forest areas, grasslands, and the savanna, or rainforest belts adjoining more open habitats. The red-footed tortoise shares some of its range with the yellow-footed tortoise. In ranges shared in Surinam, the red-footed tortoise has moved out of the forests into grasslands (created a result of slash-and-burn agriculture), while the yellow-footed tortoise has remained in the forest.

== Behavior ==
These tortoises make a sound like a baby cooing with a raspy voice. Tortoises also identify each other using body language. The male tortoise makes head movements toward other males, but the female does not make these head movements. Male tortoises also swing their heads back and forth in a continuous rhythm as a mating ritual. Mating occurs all year round for the yellow-footed tortoise. There is no parental care of the young and the baby tortoises will fend for themselves, starting by eating calcium-rich plant matter.

== Diet ==
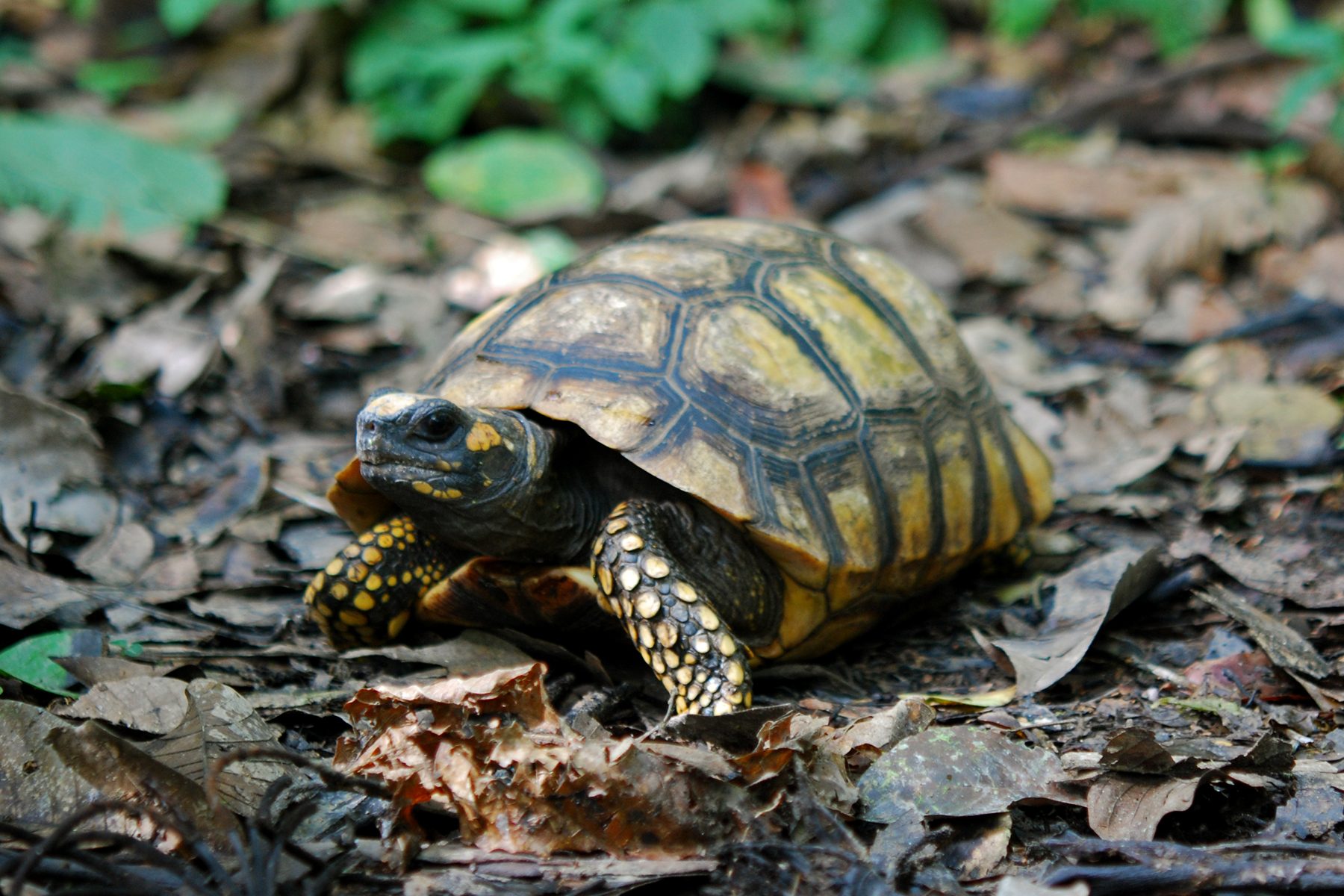
At Yasuni National Park, Ecuador

The yellow-footed tortoise eats many kinds of foliage. They are too slow to capture any fast animals. In the wild, their diets consist of grasses, flowers, fallen fruit, carrion, plants, bones, mushrooms, excrement, and slow-moving invertebrates such as snails, worms, and others they are able to capture. In captivity, they are fed oranges, apples, melons, endive, collard greens, dandelions, plantain, ribwort, clover, shredded carrots, insects, worms, cuttlebone, tortoise vitamins, edible flowers, and alfalfa pellets. Each yellow-footed tortoise in the wild reaches the age of maturity at about 8–10 years. The fecundity of a female generally depends on her size; the bigger they are, the more eggs they can produce. On average, a female will create about six to 16 eggs per year, although some female individuals may not reproduce each year. The eggs have brittle shells and are elongated to spherical, about 3–6 cm in diameter. The egg size will increase with the body size of the tortoise. The young are self-sufficient from birth. The yellow-footed tortoise can live around 50–60 years.

== Reproduction and growth ==
Breeding is synchronized with the onset of the rainy season (from July to September), where a general increase in activity is noted. Males identify each other by eliciting a characteristic head movement, a series of jerks away from and back to mid-position. Another male will make the same head movements. No head movement in response is the first indication that the other tortoise is a female. Scientific experimentation and observation has also indicated head coloration has to be correct. He will then sniff the cloacal region of the other tortoise. Copulation usually follows, though sometimes there is a period of biting at the legs. During courtship and copulation, the male makes clucking sounds very much like those of a chicken, with a set pattern in pitches of the clucking sounds. Rival males will battle, attempting to overturn each other, but neither the males nor females will defend a territory. They are considered nomadic in their movements. In almost every tortoise species where male combat occurs, the males are always larger than the females. This is in comparison to aquatic species, where the males are usually smaller than the females and do not engage in male-to-male combat. Species with male combat are thought to have evolved larger males because they have a better chance of winning a bout and mating with a female, thus passing on their larger size to their offspring. Species with smaller males evolved because smaller males are more mobile and can mate with a large number of females, thus passing on their genes.

== Conservation status ==
Yellow-footed tortoise is an endangered species. The major populations located in South America are protected under the Convention on International Trade in Endangered Species, Appendix II.

As with many species of turtles and tortoises, many yellow-footed tortoises end up as food items in local markets.

In Peru yellow-footed tortoise eggs are a delicacy. While illegal, their trade is common in the Peruvian amazon.

This species of tortoise is popular in the pet trade.
