= Pinel Island =

French Caribbean island

Native name: Îlet Pinel
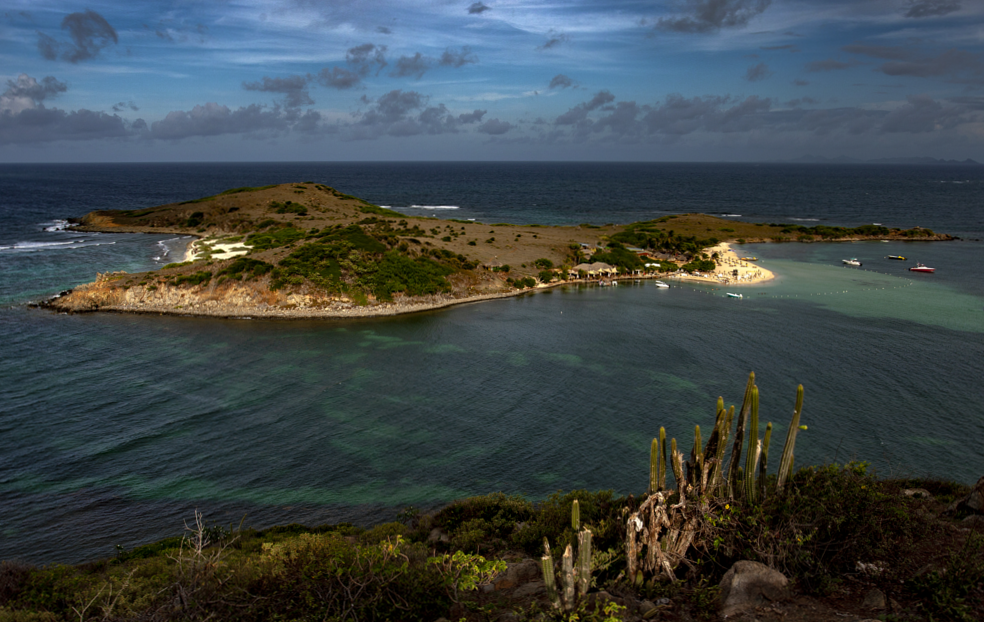
- Pinel Island seen from Saint Martin

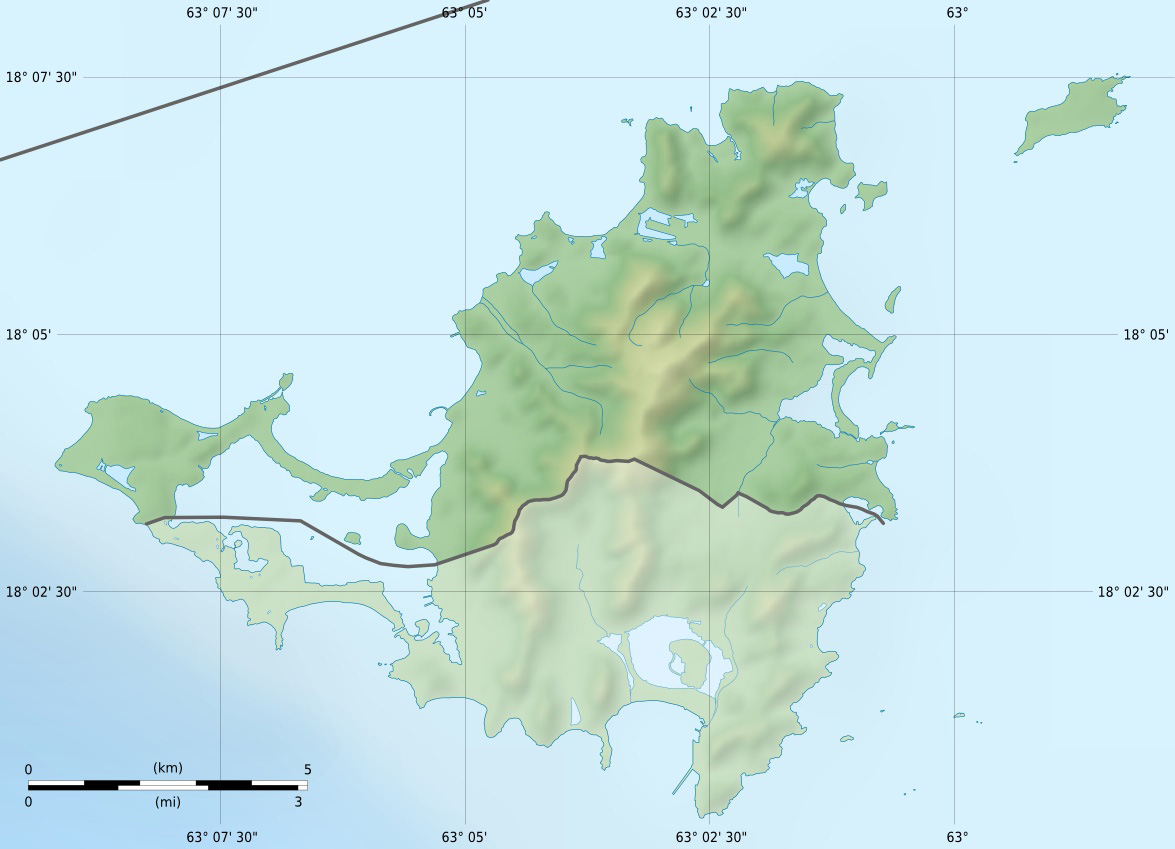
- Location within Saint-Martin Location within Lesser Antilles Location within the Caribbean

Geography
- Location: Caribbean Sea
- Coordinates: 18°6′22″N 63°00′52″W
- Archipelago: Lesser Antilles
- Area: 0.115 km^{2} (0.044 sq mi)
- Coastline: 1.945 km (1.2086 mi)
- Highest elevation: 19 m (62 ft)

Administration
- Saint Martin

Pinel Island, also known as Îlet Pinel, is a small Caribbean island off the french coast of Saint Martin.

== Geography ==
The island is a limestone ridge that was once part of the Saint Martin coast, which is now lies around 170 m away. The island has 4 beaches and 4 rocky shores. It is partly surrounded by very shallow shoals with coral. To the west, facing Saint-Martin, lies a 80 m-long tongue of sand juts out into the sea.

== History ==
According to legend, it was after attempting to conquer the island of Saba that a buccaneer, Captain Pinel, discovered this marine refuge. Faced with resistance from the island's inhabitants, the invaders retreated until they ran aground on the magnificent islet in Cul-de-Sac Bay, which has since borne his name.

In 2000 a pre-Columbian site was discovered on the southwestern beach of Pinel Island. Ceramic, lithic, and shell artifacts were found there in the sand.

== Nature ==
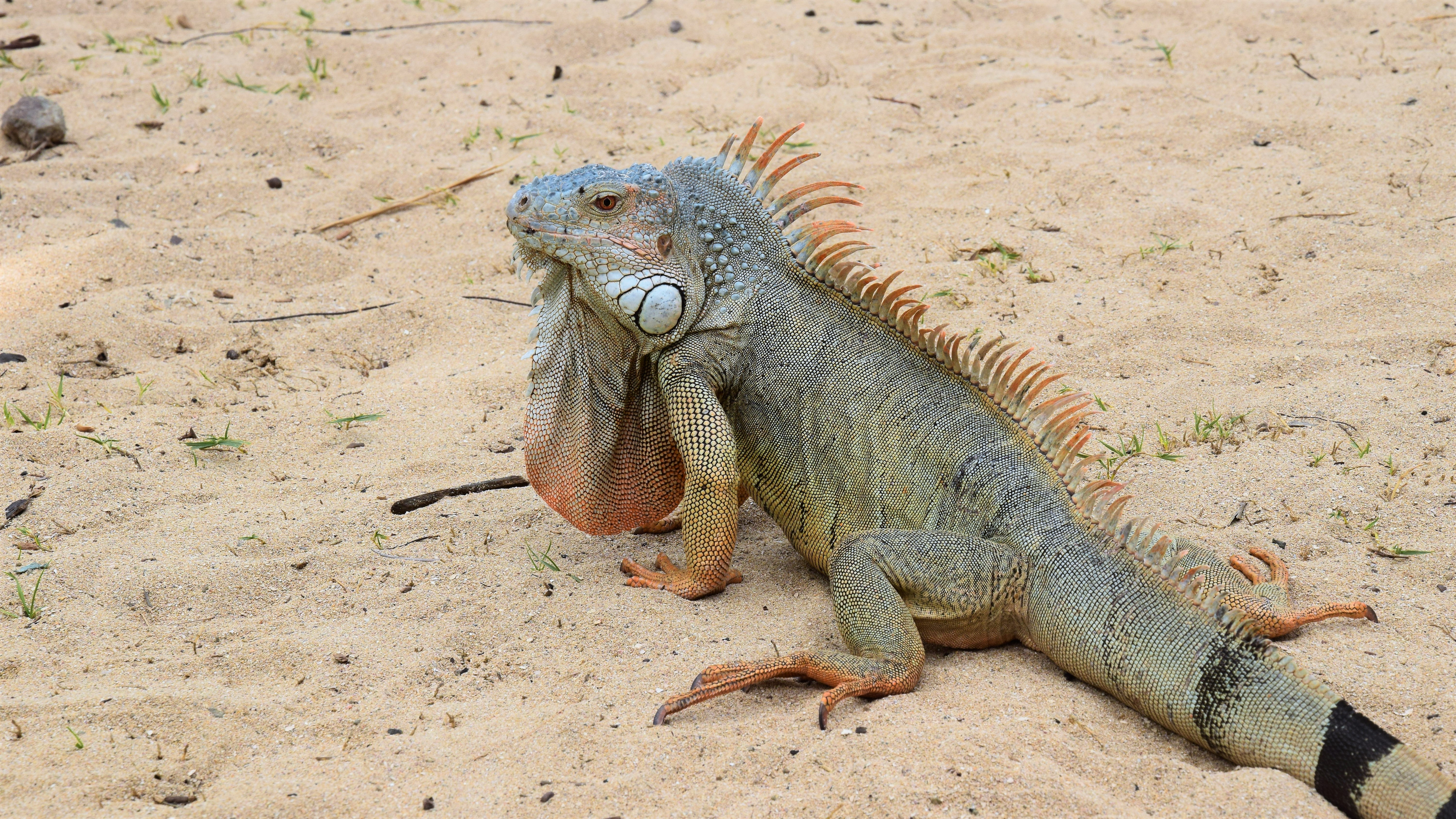
Iguana on Pinel Island

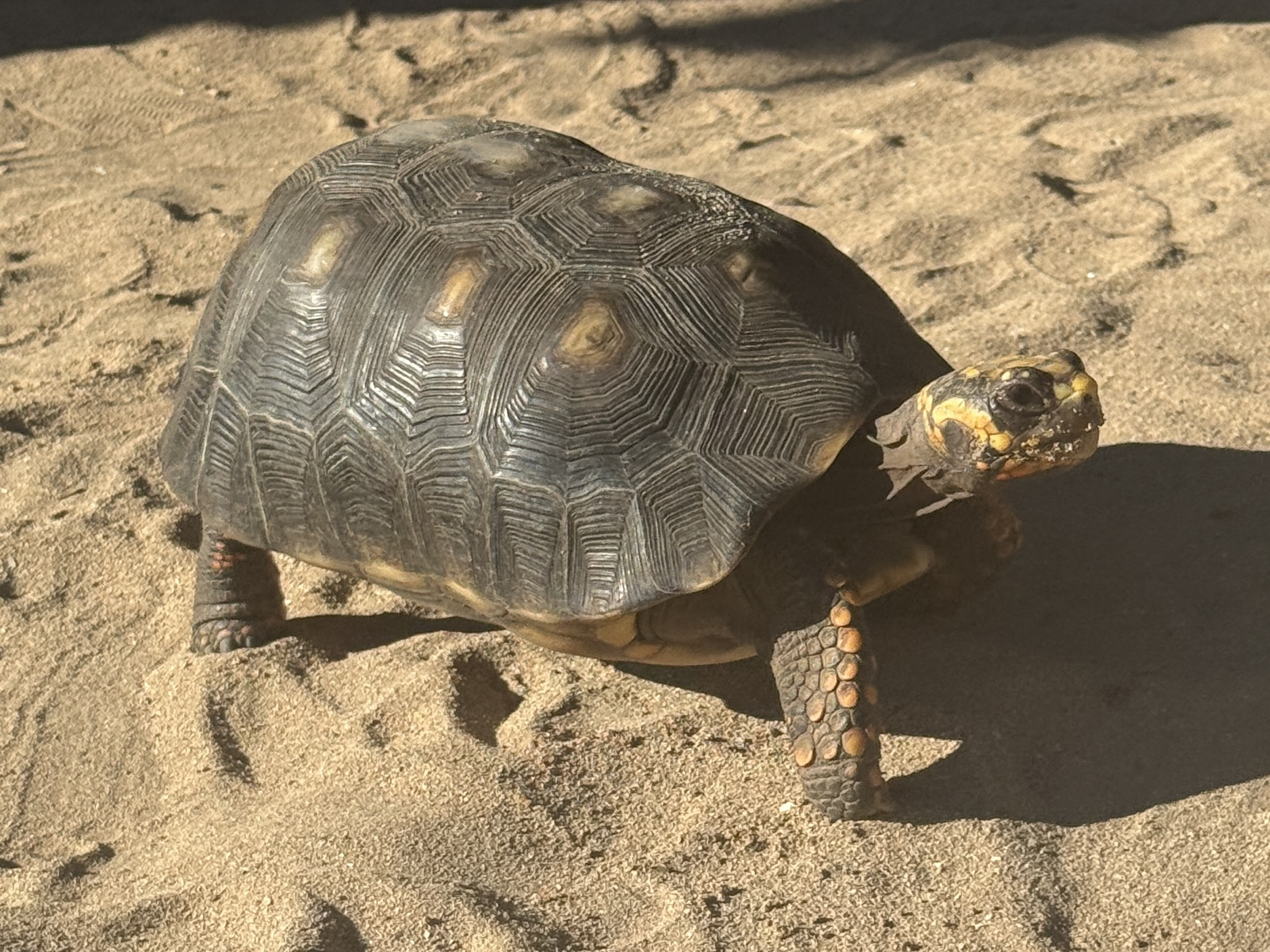
Red Footed Tortoise on Pinel Island

The island is part of the Saint Martin Natural Reserve. It is covered by a dry savannah of short grass (Greasy Donna) with some thorous groves except for goats (introduced species), lizards (ame), iguana (Iguana nudicollis), hermit crabs and birds. Because of the excessive presence of humans, seabirds pass there but no longer come to nest.

== Tourism ==
The island can be reached by a ferry service from Cul-de-Sac which departs in high season every half hour. There are two restaurants on the island. Several hiking trails travel the island.
