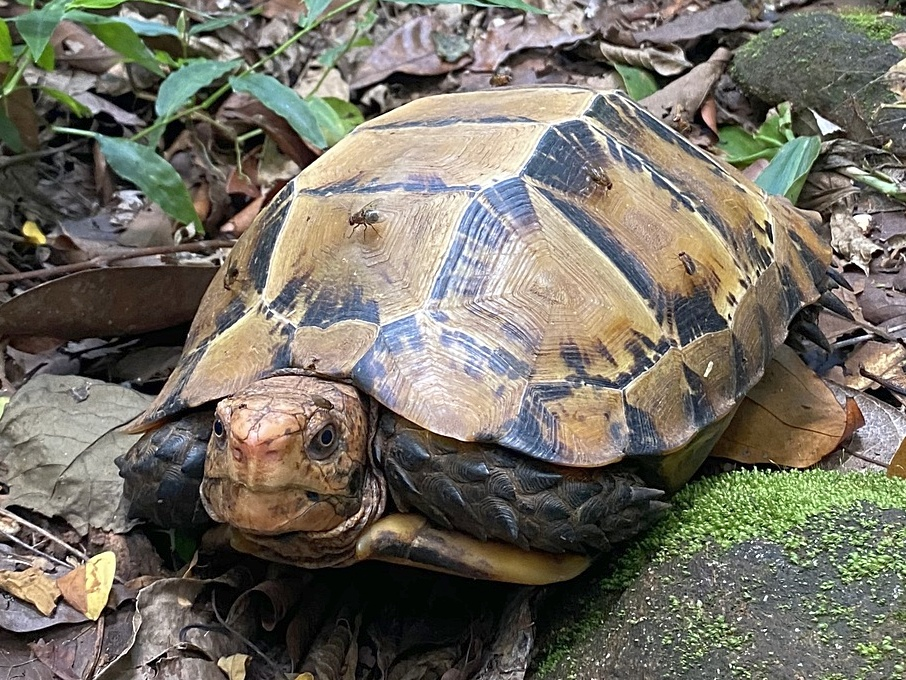
- In the wild

Conservation status
- Endangered (IUCN 3.1)

Scientific classification
- Kingdom: Animalia
- Phylum: Chordata
- Class: Reptilia
- Order: Testudines
- Suborder: Cryptodira
- Family: Testudinidae
- Genus: Manouria
- Species: M. impressa

Binomial name
- Manouria impressa (Günther, 1882).

Synonyms
- Geoemyda impressa Günther, 1882; Geoemyda latinuchalis Vaillant, 1894; Testudo pseudemys Boulenger, 1903; Testudo latinuchalis — Siebenrock, 1909; Testudo impressa — M.A. Smith, 1922; Geochelone impressa — Pritchard, 1967; Manouria impressa — Bour, 1980; Manowria impressa — Zhou & Zhou, 1991

= Impressed tortoise =

Species of tortoise

The impressed tortoise (Manouria impressa) is a species of tortoise. It occurs in mountainous forest areas in Southeast Asia, mainly in Myanmar Burma, southern China, Thailand, Laos, Vietnam, Cambodia, Malaysia and Northeast India.

== Morphology ==
The tortoise species received its name due to the shape and style of the scutes of the carapace. The scutes are concaved or "impressed", which appear similar to stamps.

The species has a golden brown to dark brown shells. Their skin is usually a paler yellow and may have pinkish noses. Adults are much smaller than their relatives the Asian forest tortoise (Manouria emys), with a maximum carapace length of 35 cm (14 in).

== Habitat ==
The impressed tortoise lives at high elevations, up to 2,000 m (6,600 ft). The non-territorial species have a relatively sedentary lifestyle with space usage and movement heavily influenced by seasonal conditions and resource availability. Despite a stationary life, the tortoises are most active in environments at temperatures between 12-30 degrees Celsius and 60-100% humidity.

These animals may also play a vital role in their environment by indirectly spreading fungi spores through defication.

== Behavior ==
The primary behavior of the impressed tortoise is hiding, with most individuals spending most of their time concealed under leaves or vegetation. Its behavior is little known due to the small known population; diet in the wild has been observed to consist primarily of mushrooms. While mushrooms compose majority of the tortoise's diet, bugs such as beetles and other larvae could be consumed accidentally in the process. Consuming these extra creatures could further provide extra nutrients and protein to the impressed tortoises. Furthermore, feeding occurs primarily in the wet season as mushrooms are more available from May to July.

When the species is not hiding, these tortoises can be found basking after period of inactivity. The behavior often helps with raising body temperature as well as digestion.

== Reproduction ==
Impressed tortoises usually create large nests during the breeding season from early spring throughout the summer and lay eggs between June and July. A female can lay anywhere from 10 to 20 eggs in a single clutch. At optimal temperatures, the eggs can hatch in 65-80 days.

== History ==
The species is known for being difficult to keep alive in captivity because not much is known about it; although its status in the wild is uncertain, it is eaten widely by local people and little captive breeding has occurred.

As of 2026, there is only one known successful impressed tortoise breeding group under an AZA-accredited faculty in the United States. The society is called The Turtle Conservancy located in California. Despite efforts to help these tortoises increase population sizes, they are still listed as endangered through the IUCN Red List website.

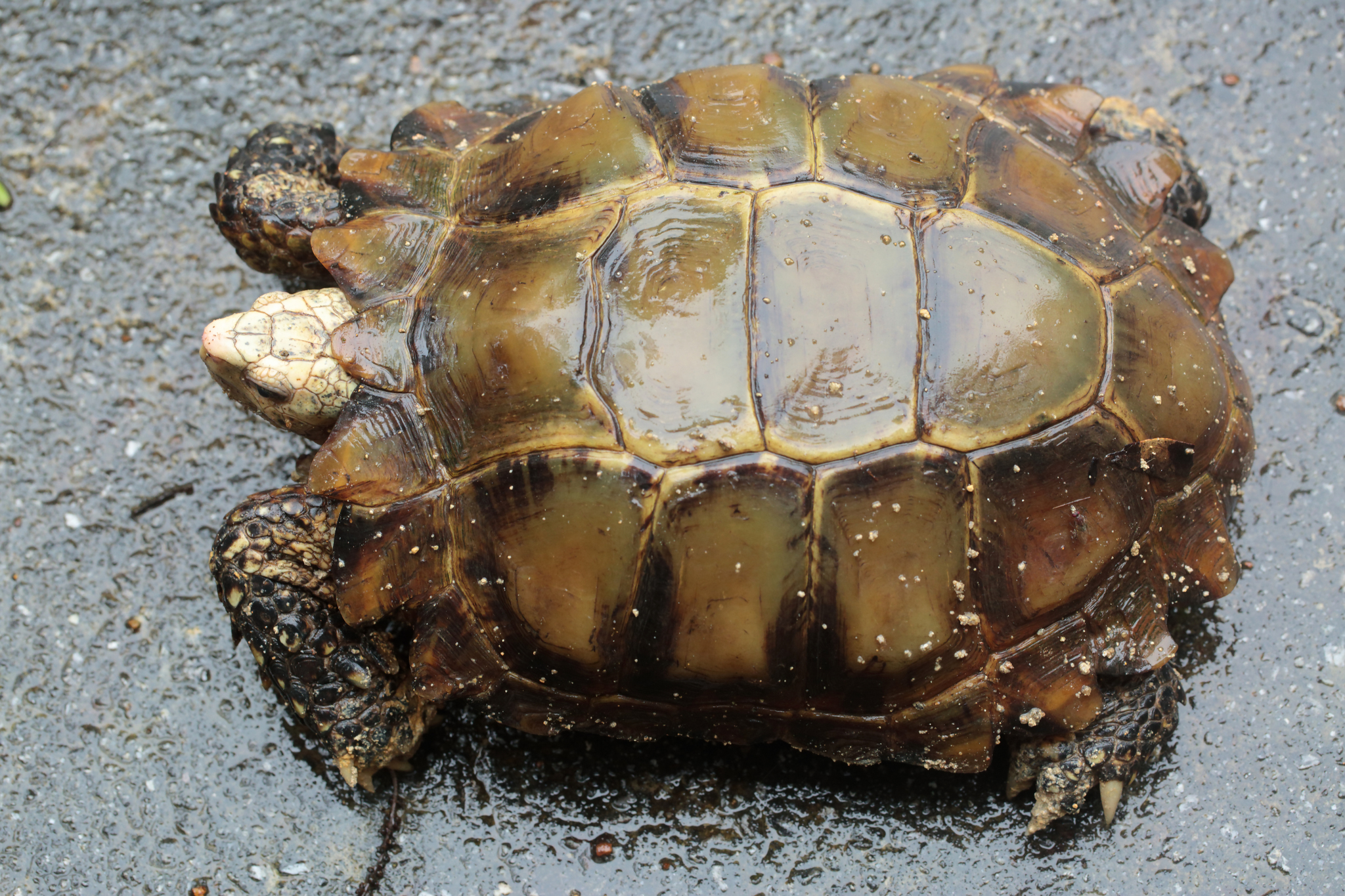

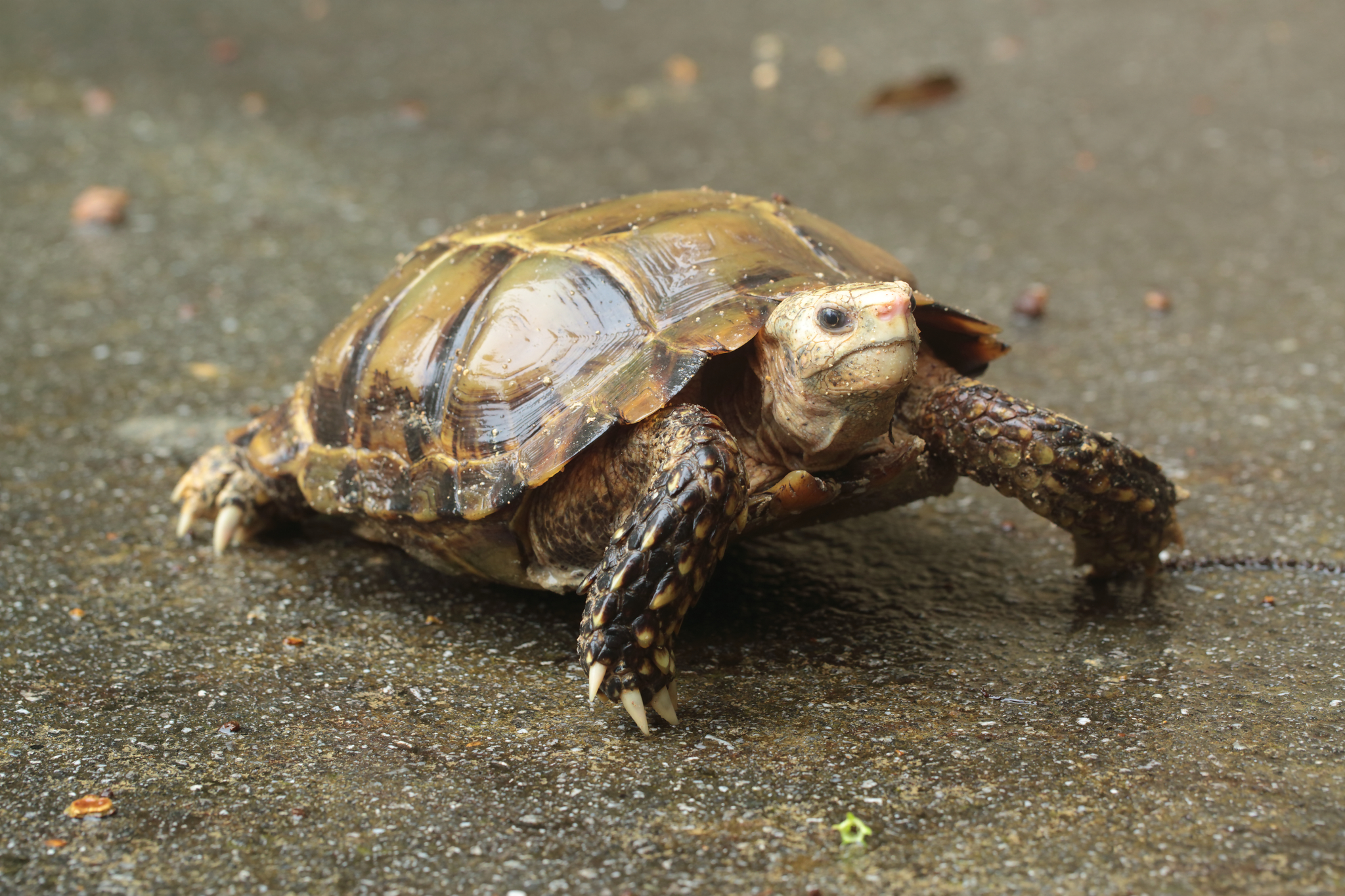

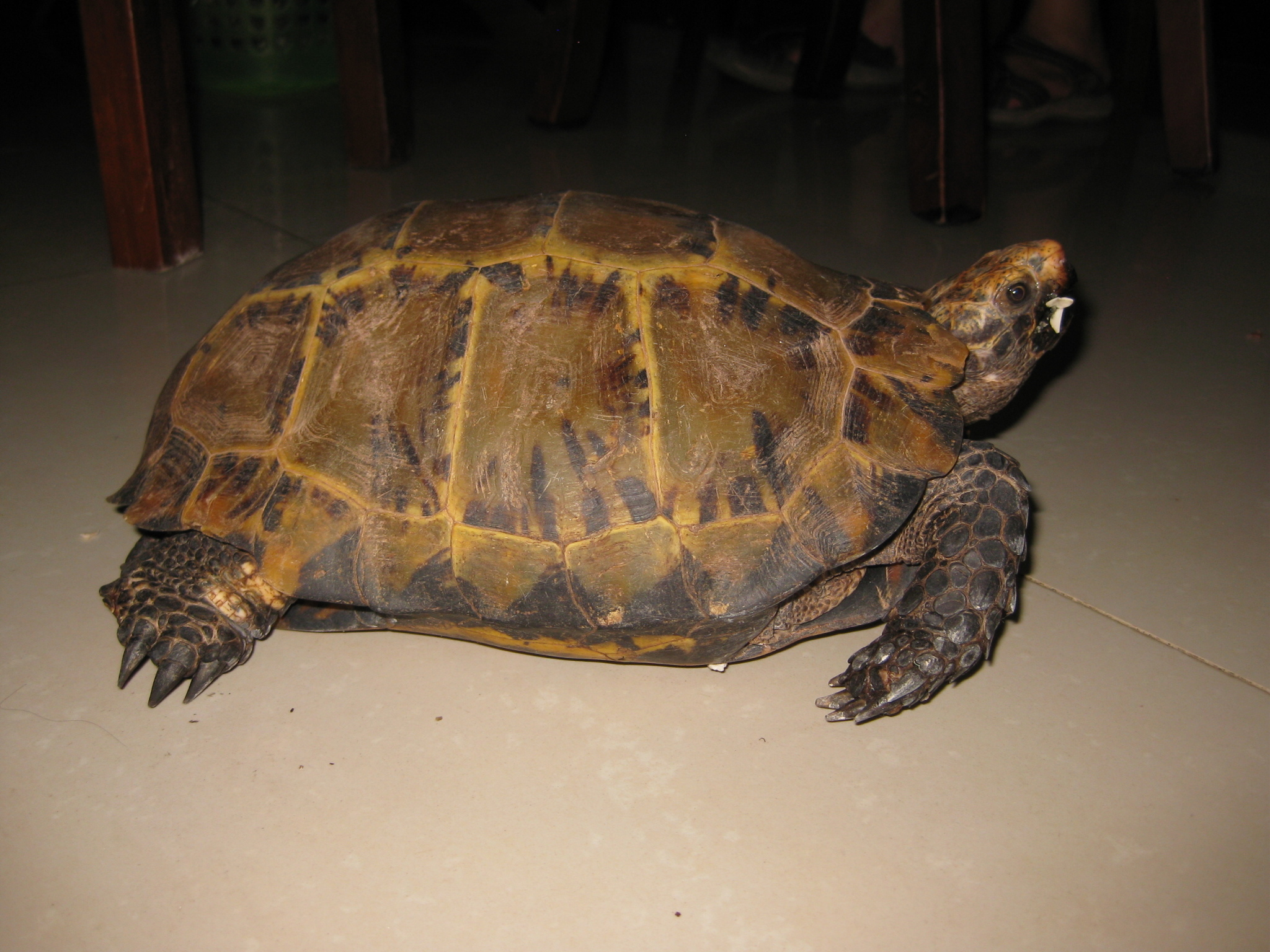
