= Cul-de-Sac, Saint Martin =

Cul-de-Sac
- Location within Saint-Martin
- Coordinates: 18°06′22″N 63°01′48″W
- Country: France
- Overseas collectivity: Saint Martin

Cul-de-Sac (French pronunciation: [ky də sak]; formerly Cul-de-Sac de la Barrière) is a small town on the French side of the island of Saint Martin in the Caribbean. It lies on the northeast coast of the island, opposite Îlet Pinel and Île Tintamarre. The town is close to Orient Bay beach and the beaches of Anse Marcel, Petites-Cayes, and Grandes-Cayes.

For long, the town was a small fishing village, but has seen urbanization since the 1990s. A number of hotels, residences, and a collège have since been established in the town.
