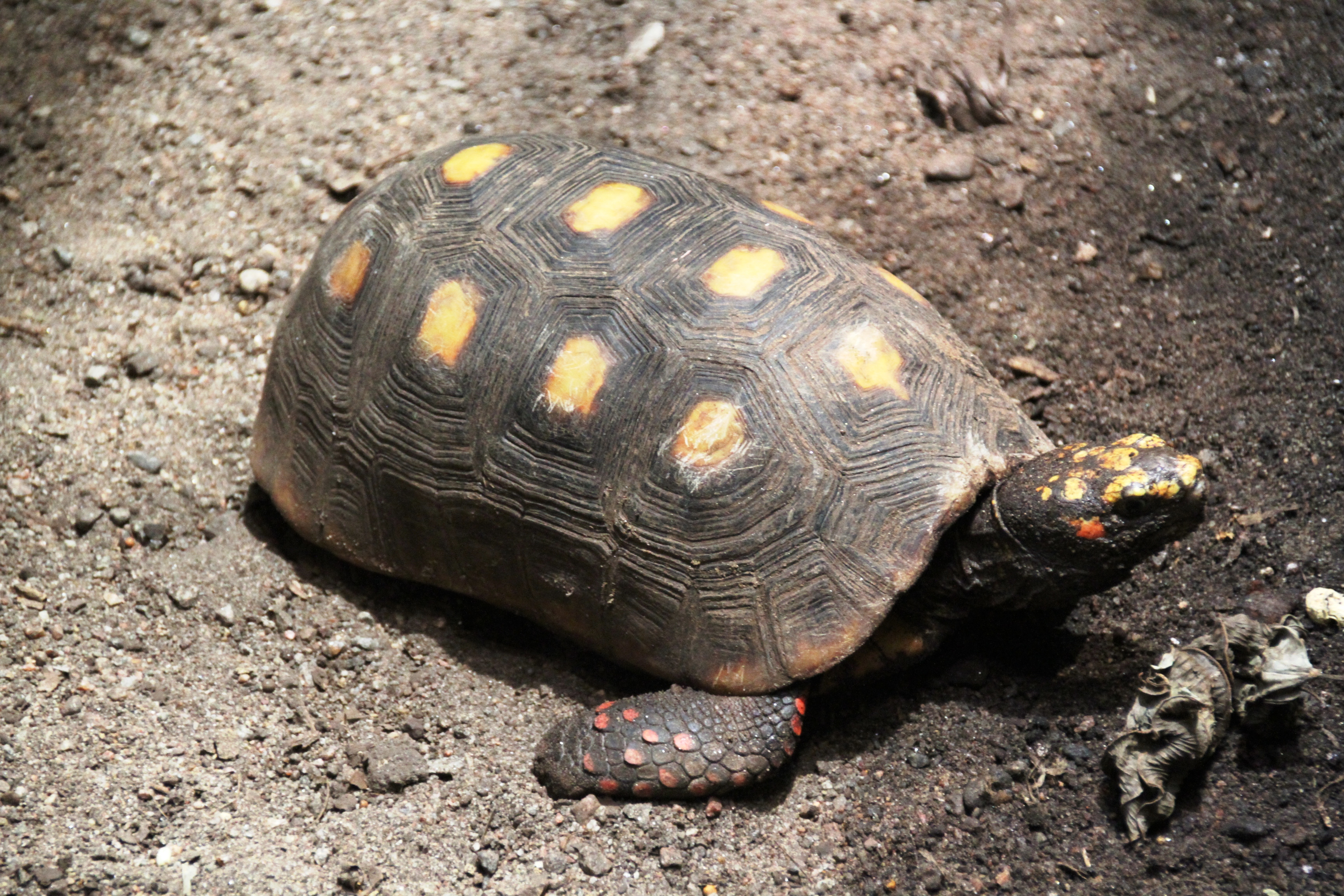

Scientific classification
- Kingdom: Animalia
- Phylum: Chordata
- Class: Reptilia
- Order: Testudines
- Suborder: Cryptodira
- Family: Testudinidae
- Genus: Chelonoidis
- Species: C. carbonarius

Binomial name
- Chelonoidis carbonarius (Spix, 1824)

Synonyms
- Testudo carbonaria Spix, 1824:22; Testudo hercules truncata Gray, 1830:3; Testudo boiei Wagler, 1833:pl.13

= Red-footed tortoise =

Species of tortoise

The red-footed tortoise (Chelonoidis carbonarius) is a species of tortoise from northern South America. These medium-sized tortoises generally average 30 cm (12 in) as adults, but can reach over 40 cm (16 in). They have dark-colored (nearly black), “loaf”-shaped carapaces (top shell) with a lighter patch in the middle of each scute (shell segment), and a somewhat lighter-colored plastron (underbelly). They also have dark limbs dotted with brightly-colored scales, from which they get their name, that range from pale yellow to vivid or dark red. Visible differences are noted between red-footed tortoises from varying eco-regions. They are closely related to the more easterly-distributed yellow-footed tortoise (C. denticulatus) of the Amazon Basin.

Their natural habitat ranges from savannah to forest edges around the Amazon Basin. They are omnivorous tortoises, consuming a wide assortment of plants, grasses, flowers, fruit and (notably) fungi, as well as the occasional earthworm or other invertebrate. When presented with the opportunity, many tortoises will also scavenge on carrion. They do not brumate, due to their equatorial home range, but may aestivate in the hotter, drier months.

Red-footed (and yellow-footed) tortoises are popularly kept as pets. Over-collection of eggs, and the capturing of mature animals, from their native habitat has caused them to be listed as “vulnerable” to extinction, despite the relative ease of captive breeding and the availability of captive-bred tortoises. Additionally, many remote tribal groups living in South America still consider the tortoises a basic source of meat, and many are unaware of the species’ overall plight; many travelers and activists report seeing live red-footed tortoises for sale in markets where bushmeat and live animals are sold. Eggs, hatchlings, and even mature tortoises are food for many animal predators, including caimans, crocodiles and giant otters (if near water), as well as birds of prey, bushdogs, jaguars, jaguarundis, margays, certain monkeys, ocelots, pumas and tayras. Population density ranges from locally common to very scarce due, in-part, to habitat destruction and the aforementioned over-collection for food and the pet trade.

The species name has often been misspelled as carbonaria, an error introduced in the 1980s when Chelonoidis was elevated to genus and mistakenly treated as feminine, an error recognized and fixed in 2017.

== Names ==
Red-footed tortoises have many common names: red-leg, red-legged, or red-foot tortoise (often without the hyphen) and the savanna tortoise, as well as local names, such as carumbe or karumbe, which means 'slow moving' (Brazil, Paraguay), wayapopi or morrocoy (Venezuela, Colombia), and variations of jabuti such as japuta and jabuti-piranga (Brazil, Argentina). In Portuguese, jabuti (jaboti) refers to both the red-footed tortoise and the yellow-footed tortoise.

It is also called kati in Natú and sambó in Kiriri.

== Taxonomy ==
Red footed tortoises were originally assigned to the genus Testudo (named by Carl Linnaeus in 1758) for a short time, but it soon became the term for turtles with high-domed shells, elephantine legs, and completely terrestrial habits—the tortoises. In 1835, Leopold Fitzinger used Geochelone to differentiate some non-Mediterranean tortoises, apparently based on size and lack of specific identifying characteristics such as the hinged shell in the African hingeback tortoises. He used the term Chelonoidis as a subgenus for the species from South America. Few people used these terms until they were resurrected by Hewitt in 1933 and Loveridge and Williams in 1957.

In 1982, Roger Bour and Charles Crumly each separated Geochelone into different genera based on anatomic differences, especially in the skulls. That resulted in the formation or restoration of several genera: Aldabrachelys, Astrochelys, Cylindraspis, Indotestudo, Manouria, and Chelonoidis. Chelonoidis was distinguished from other Geochelone by their South American location, as well as the absence of the nuchal scute (the marginal centered over the neck) and the presence of a large, undivided supracaudal (the scute or scutes directly over the tail), as well as differences in the skull. Many of these generic names are still debated; for example, no specific definition of Geochelone is given, and Chelonoidis is primarily used for geography rather than unique anatomic characteristics.

The species name carbonarius means 'coal-like' referring to a dark coal with glowing patches. It was originally identified by Johann Baptist von Spix in 1824. The holotype was kept in the Zoologischen Sammlung des Bayerischen Staates in Munich, Germany, but was lost. Paulo Vanzolini believes it may have come from near the city of Manaus, Brazil, on the Rio Negro. No subspecies of red-footed tortoise are recognized, although many believe the species has five or more variants that may be subspecies or even separate species.

== Description ==
Red-footed tortoises show sex, regional, and individual variations in color, shell shape, and minor anatomical characteristics. Adult carapaces are generally an elongated oval with sides that are nearly parallel, although the sides of males may curve inwards. They are fairly highly domed and smooth with a rather flat back (although the scutes may be raised or 'pyramided' in some individuals, especially captive specimens). Often, a high point over the hips is seen, with a small sloped section over the neck. The vertebral and costal scutes (the scutes along the center and sides of the carapace) are black or dark brown with a pale yellow areole in the center. The marginals (scutes along the edge of the carapace) 'tuck under' along the sides and flare slightly over the limbs. They are dark with the pale aureole along the middle of the lower edge. The nuchal scute (the marginal over the neck) is absent, and the marginals over the tail are joined as one large supracaudal. Growth rings are clearly evident in most individuals, but become worn smooth with age.

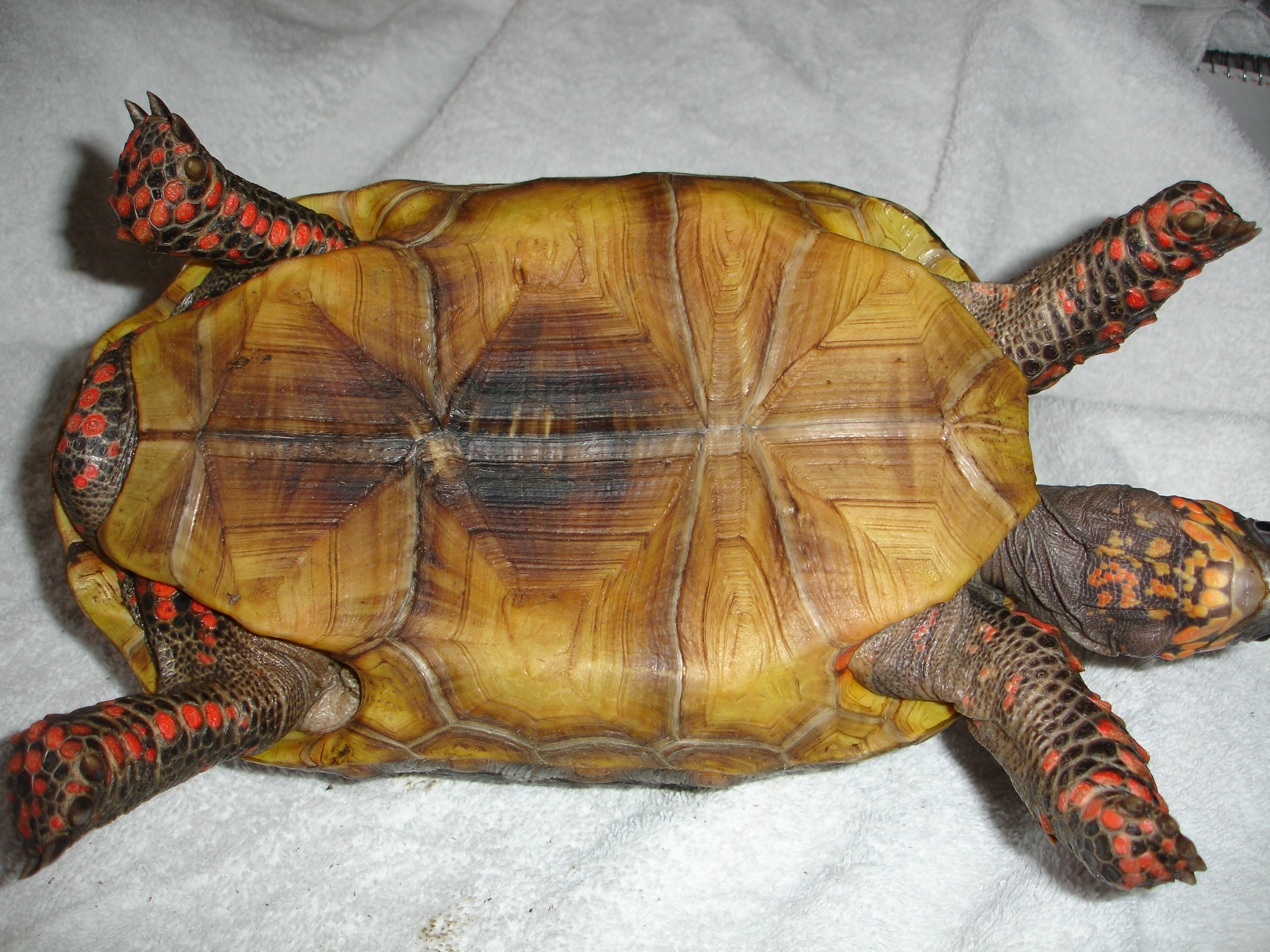
Plastron view of an adult male red-footed tortoise

The plastron (bottom shell) is large and thick along the edges. The gulars (frontmost pair of plastron scutes) do not protrude much past the front of the carapace. The plastron of a male is deeply indented, and the anal scutes (rearmost pair of plastron scutes) may be used to sex the animal while the color pattern varies by region.

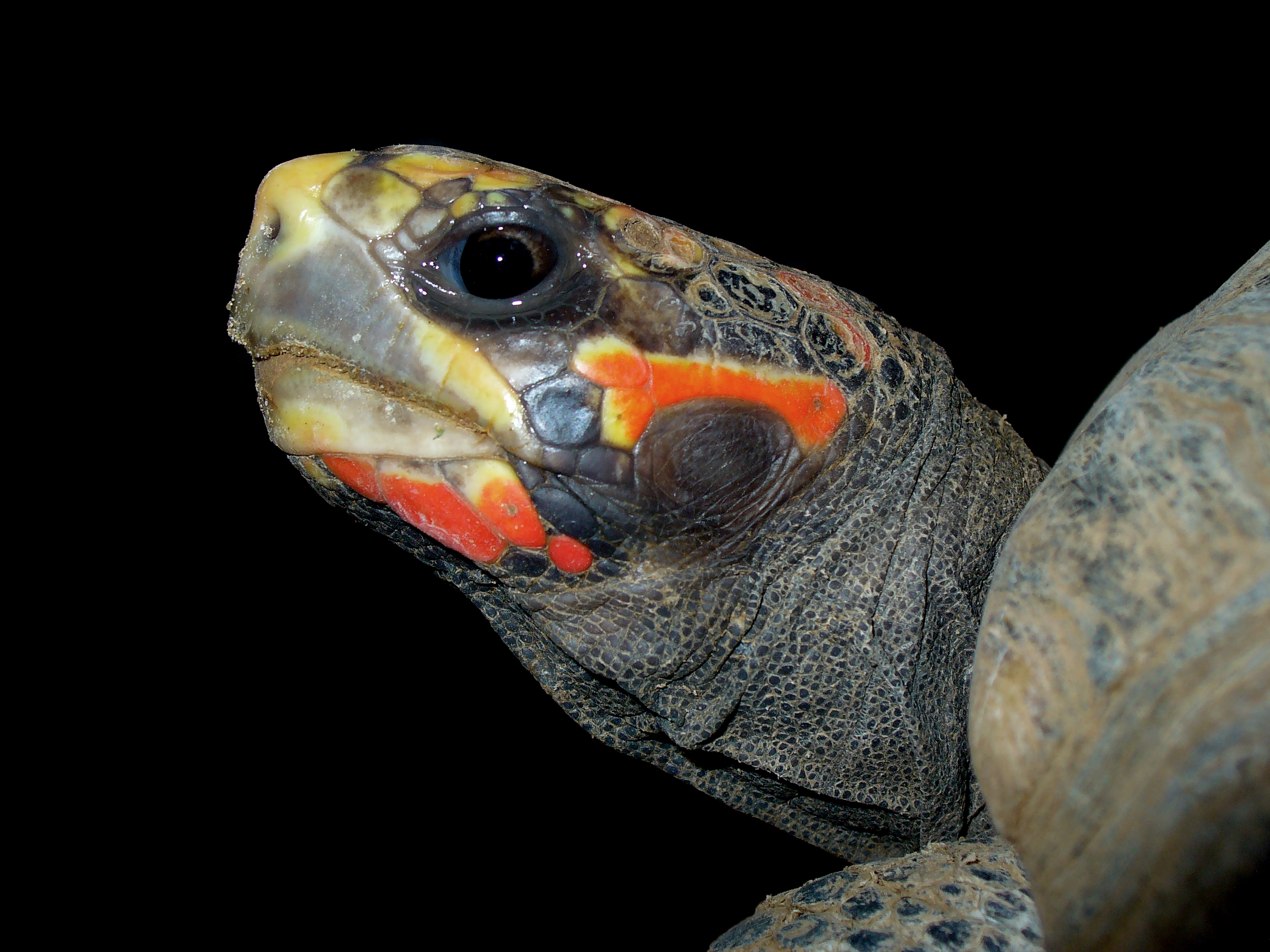
Red-footed tortoise profile

The head is relatively small with a squared-off profile and flat on top, longer than it is wide. The eye is large with a brown, almost black iris, and rarely any sclera visible around it. The upper jaw is slightly hooked, and the upper jaw is notched in the front middle. About 15 to 20 'teeth' or fine grooves occur on each side of each jaw. A nearly circular tympanum is located behind and below the eye and is covered with a dark scale. The scales of the head are generally smallish and irregular, becoming small and pebbly on the neck. Many of the scales are colored pale yellow to brick red, especially those on the top of the head, above the tympanum, around the nostrils, on the lower jaw, and on the sides of the neck. Males are usually slightly more colorful than females, and colors vary by region.

The limbs are generally cylindrical with five claws on the fore limbs and four on the hind, but no visible toes. The fore limbs are slightly flattened and the front surface is covered with large scales, mostly with the same color as the head. They are not as large or protrusive as they are in more primitive species such as the African spurred tortoise (Geochelone sulcata). The tail is muscular, varies in length and overall shape by sex, and lacks any sort of claw on the tip.

Average adult sizes vary by region and sex, and 'giants' are often encountered. Red-footed tortoises average 30–35 cm (12–14 in) with males slightly larger overall. Tortoises up to 45 cm (18 in) are fairly common and over 50 cm (20 in) are occasionally discovered. The largest known specimen, from Paraguay, was 60 cm (24 in) long, and weighed over 28 kg (62 lb). It is unknown if the 'giants' represent diet availability, genetic issues, longevity, or other possibilities.

Hatchling and young red-footed tortoises have much rounder and flatter carapaces that start off as mostly pale yellow to brown. New growth adds dark rings around the pale center of each scute. The marginals of very young tortoises are serrated, especially over the hind limbs. This probably aids in both camouflage against the leaf litter and in making the small animals harder to eat. Young tortoises are generally more colorful overall.

Differentiating female (left) and male (right) red-footed tortoises

Males are slightly larger and more colorful overall. The carapace of a male from north of the Amazon basin shows a 'wasp waist', or constrictions along the sides. The male's plastron is deeply indented to help with positioning during mating. The male's tail is long and muscular, generally carried along a side while the female's tail is short and conical.

The anal scutes vary to allow the male's tail more mobility and allows more protection for the female's hind end. The gap between the points of the anal scales and the marginals is wider and the anal scutes form a broader angle—almost a straight line across—in males to allow the tail to move laterally. The angle is more closed (to about a 90° angle) and the points are closer to the marginals in females.

== Distribution and habitat ==
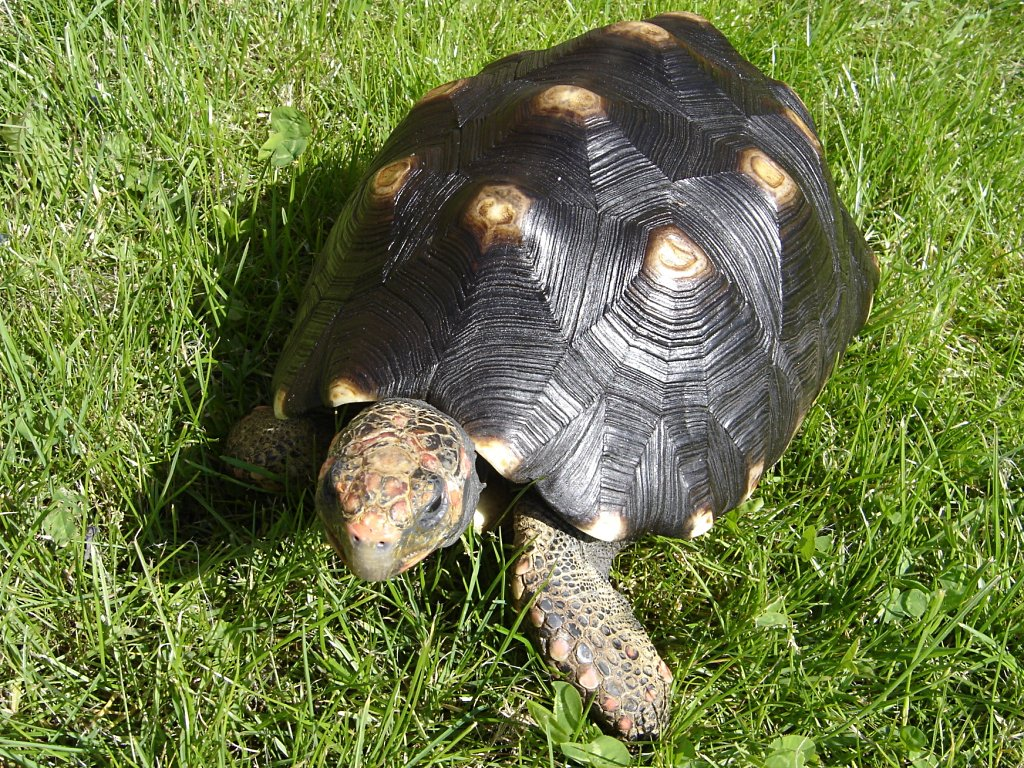
Geochelone carbonarius 1

Red-footed tortoises range from southeastern Panama to Venezuela, Guyana, Suriname, and Guiana in the north; south along the Andes to the west in Colombia, Ecuador, Peru, and Bolivia; east to Brazil, and along the southern range in Bolivia, Paraguay, and possibly northern Argentina. In Panama they live from the Darien Gap to the canal. They are not evenly distributed within their range. For example, they are not often found in central Brazil or in heavily forested areas in general, and have only documented in Peru since 1985. Accurate range information is complicated by the sheer size of the range, political and geographic barriers, and confusion about where many specimens were collected.

They are also found on several Caribbean Islands, although it is not always clear if they are native or brought by humans. Many of the colonies seem to have been established in the 17th century as food supplies or as pets. They are found on the former Netherlands Antilles, Trinidad, Tobago, Grenada, Barbados, St. Vincent, the Grenadines, Santa Lucia, Martinique, Dominica, Guadalupe, the Leeward Islands, the Virgin Islands, Barbuda living in sink-holes forests and Puerto Rico.

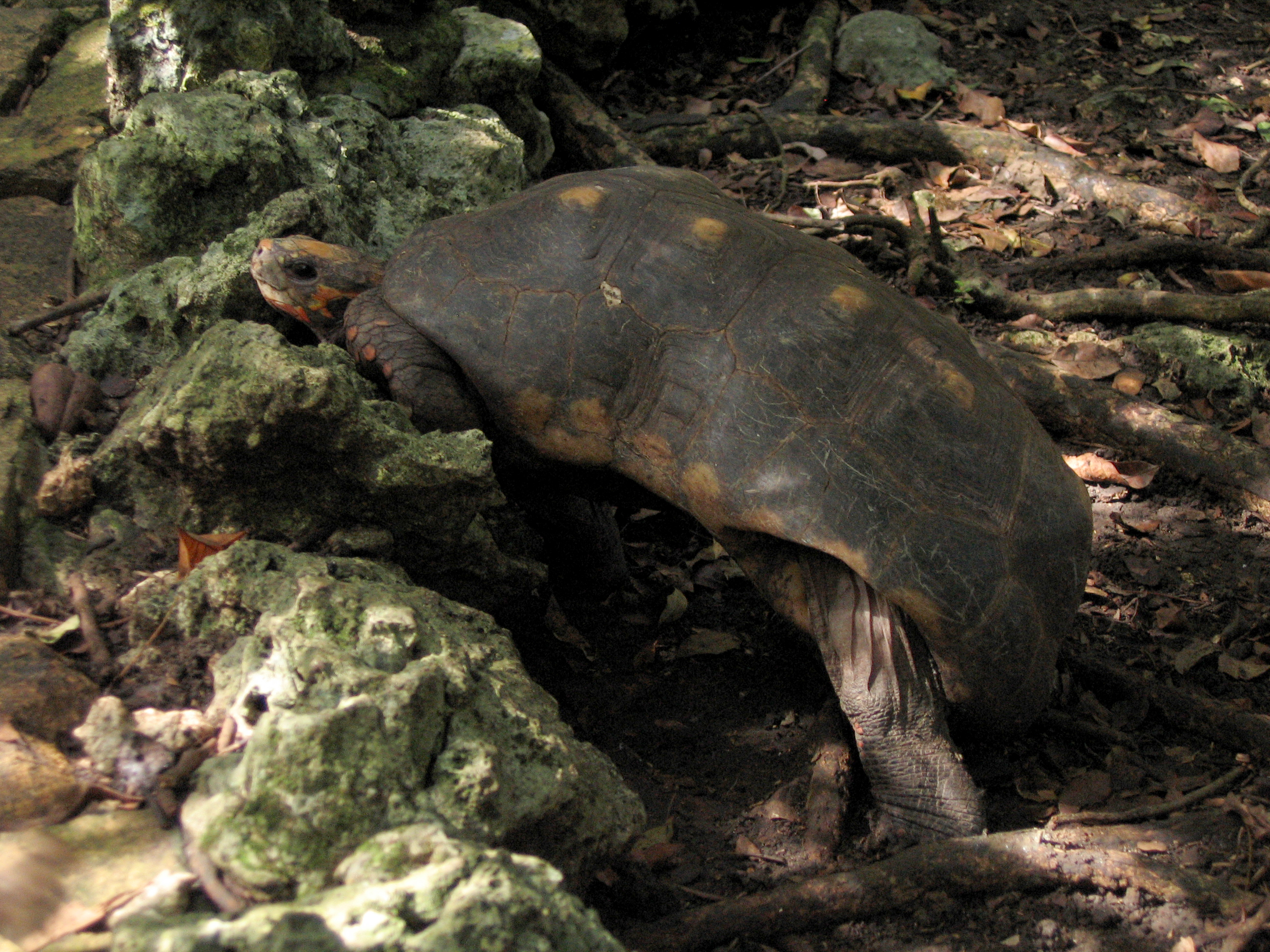
Red-footed tortoise in Barbados

The preferred habitat of the red-footed tortoise varies somewhat by region, but generally includes fairly consistent seasonal temperatures near 30 °C (86 °F) that rarely get lower than 20 °C (68 °F) or over 35 °C (95 °F), generally with high humidity and plenty of rainfall, although some of the areas can get quite dry. Most of the range experiences cooler wet seasons (April to August) and warmer dry seasons (September to March), but some parts of the southern range have occasional cold snaps. Red-footed tortoises are often found in or near transitional areas between forest and savannah, such as forest clearings, wood edges, or along waterways.

=== Regional variations ===
Various authors have divided the red-footed tortoise into different groups by anatomy and geography. Peter Pritchard recognized seven types, but DNA research has identified five genotypes.

The most obvious differences are between the groups found north or south of the Amazon basin. The 'northern' variants all look very much like the holotype and are distinguished primarily by shell, head, and limb coloration. The variants south of the Amazon are generally both larger and smaller than the holotype, have a very different plastral pattern, and have an enlarged scale or 'spur' on the inside of the fore limb elbow.

==== Northeastern variant ====
This is the holotype of the species. Head and limb colors are generally light orange to red. Plastrons are mostly pale yellow. They range in the Guiana Shield—Venezuela, Guyana, Suriname, Guiana, and northern Brazil.

==== Northwestern variant ====
They are similar to the northeastern variant, but their carapace base color is grey, dark brown, or coffee rather than black. Their pale plastrons have central dark areas resembling an exclamation point. Their heads and limbs are generally pale yellow to orange. The average size is slightly smaller than usual—30–35 cm (12–14 in). They are found in southeast Panama and Colombia.

==== Northern variant ====
These also are similar to the northeastern variant, with head and limb colors generally pale yellow to light orange, rarely red, and their heads and limbs are often slightly different colors. The average size is slightly smaller than usual—30–35 cm (12–14 in). They are found in Colombia, Ecuador, and Peru.

==== Southern variant ====
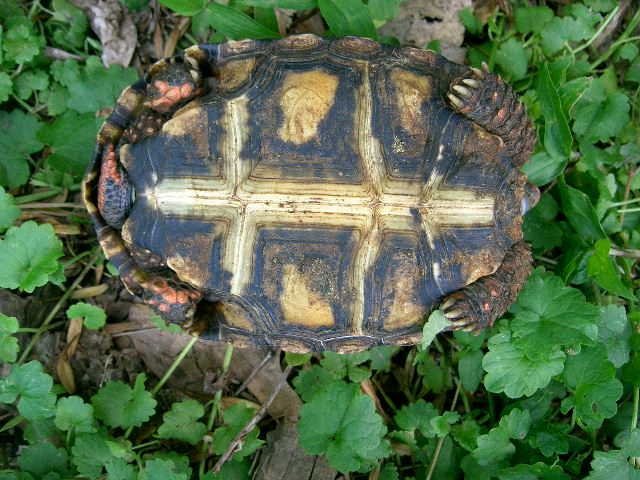
Plastron view of a young red-footed tortoise from Brazil, also called 'cherryhead'

The southern variants' carapaces are often not quite black to dark brown, sometimes with light grey or whitish between the scutes. Their plastrons are mostly dark in a symmetrical mottled pattern. Size tends to be larger on average than northeastern variants, with the largest individuals found in this area. Fore limbs feature a slightly enlarged scale on the side of the 'elbow'. Adult males do not have the constricted waist, and females average a bit larger than the males. They are seen in the Gran Chaco—Bolivia, Paraguay, and northern Argentina.

==== Eastern variant ====
Carapaces of the eastern variants are often light grey or whitish between the scutes. Their plastrons are mostly dark in a symmetrical mottled pattern. Size tends to be smaller on average than northeastern variants, also reaching sexual maturity at a smaller size. Fore limbs feature a slightly enlarged scale on the side of the 'elbow'. Their heads and limbs are either yellowish or red, ranging to brilliant cherry-red. They are located in east to southeast Brazil. The red-headed type of this variant is often called a 'cherry-head' in the pet trade.

== Population features ==
Little information is available about population density or sex ratios. Many specimens are recorded from near research stations and cities, but that is almost certainly more due to the ease of finding them there than higher localized populations. They are considered one of the most common turtle species in many localities. When a dam was being built in the Edo region of Venezuela, several hundreds of the red- and yellow-footed tortoises were captured for relocation. Large numbers are also found in markets, confiscated at airports, etc. However, very few records exist from Peru, Ecuador, Argentina, and central Brazil. In the Guiana Shield region, islands of higher populations and stretches where few have been located are seen.

Counting tortoises that are often well-hidden, dug in, deep in burrows, etc. is difficult. Trained dogs discover many that otherwise might not be found. One study showed a nearly balanced mix of 1.32 males per female, and 1.05 red-footed tortoises per hectare (2.4 acres) on the island, which may be an underestimate due to the difficulty in finding the tortoises.

== Evolutionary history and fossil record ==
The genus Chelonoidis has two main subcategories based on appearance and habitat—the C. carbonarius and the C. chilensis groups. The C. carbonarius group has the closely related red- and yellow-footed tortoises that clearly share a common ancestor. The C. chilensis group features the Chaco tortoise (C. chilensis) and Galápagos tortoise (C. niger), which share similar habitats and a basic appearance, but otherwise do not seem to be closely related. The relationship between the groups is unclear.

Several theories are offered to explain the relatively small number of tortoise species in South America and the relationship between them, but the fossil record is not very complete. One long-held theory is that they came from Asia using the land bridge, then spread down through North America and shared ancestors with the gopher tortoises (Gopherus species). Another holds Geochelone ancestors floated over from central Africa, taking advantage of their ability to float, resist salt water, and go without food for extended periods.

DNA studies suggest that the carbonarius group may be related to the African hingeback tortoises (Kinixys species). This suggests that they might have come from Gondwana before it separated into Africa and South America some 130 million years ago. One ancestral form from about 5mya, Chelonoidis hesterna (Auffenberg 1971), is thought to have lived in wet forests and split into two species in the Miocene with the yellow-footed tortoises remaining in the deep forest and the red-footeds colonizing the edges of the forests and the emerging savannahs. As the climate and topography changed, groups of red-footed tortoises became physically separated and genetically isolated.

== Ecology and behavior ==
The red-footed tortoise's climate in the northern part of the range changes little day to day and rarely gets too hot for them, so the tortoises do not need to practice any form of dormancy and can often forage all day long. The tortoises in Moskovitz's study area were most active after 3:00pm while many species from warmer climes would be most active in the morning and evening. Tortoises from the southern parts of the range experience much hotter, colder, and drier conditions than most of the range and aestivate when food becomes scarce. They may aestivate or brumate when the temperatures are low enough.

Most species of tortoise spend much of their day inactive, and red-footed tortoises generally spend over 50% of the daylight hours at rest. They may rest for even longer after a large meal, with five- to ten-day stretches being common. One large specimen seems to have stayed in the same position for over a month. Resting tortoises barely move, allowing leaf litter to accumulate on them, and termites have built tunnels on the carapaces of resting red-footed tortoises.

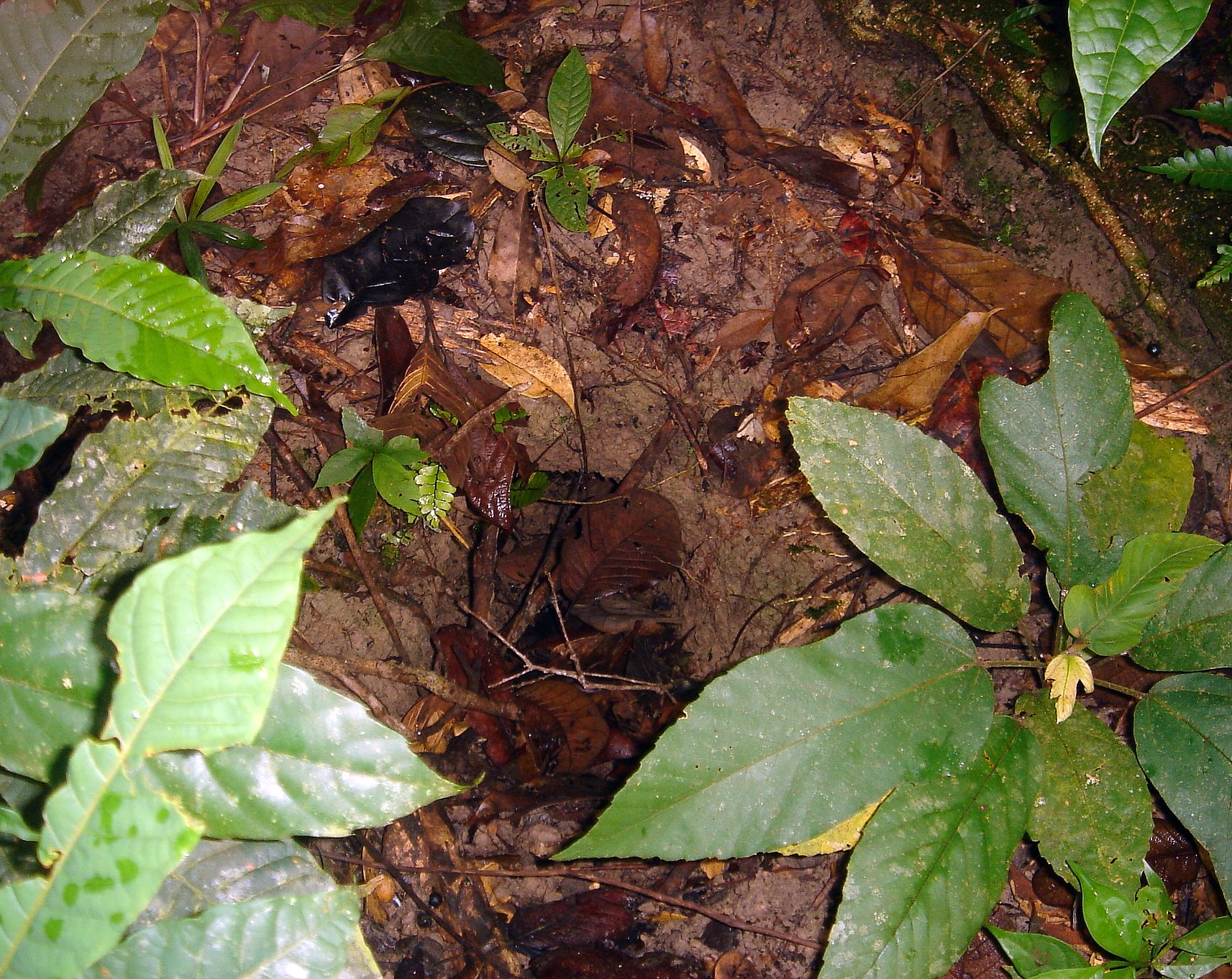
Unused armadillo burrow in Brazil

They seek shelter in places that offer thermoregulation and protection from predators. Treefalls are a favored site, as are debris piles, burrows (especially those of the armadillo (Dasypodidae family) and agouti (Dasyprocta species)), hollow logs, holes, and heavy vegetation cover. They generally try to find tight-fitting resting places, and will occasionally 'wedge' themselves between roots and trunks but remain otherwise exposed. Burrows and holes are often flooded and the tortoises will rest in the water and mud with just their nostrils and eyes exposed. In warmer weather, they press up against moister, cooler surfaces in shelter areas. The tortoises show personal preferences with many individuals always seeking out a specific type of shelter.

Shelters are often communal with as many tortoises as can fit in the space. Good shelters are so important, and visibility is so poor that the tortoises will leave scent trails that they or others can follow. Some shelters are so heavily used by tortoises that clear trails in the dirt lead to them, though individual tortoises may not return to a given shelter regularly.

Besides communal shelters and scent marking, red-footed tortoises also show other signs of semisocial behavior such as lack of aggression at feeding sites, not protecting territory, and group feeding at fruit falls and carrion (although it is not unusual for one tortoise to block access or even try to make off with some of the food). Red-footed tortoises often follow each other, usually a smaller one following a larger and quite often males following males, but all combinations are seen. They have also been observed following apparent scent trails laid by an individual a day or two earlier.

=== Predators ===
Hatchling and young tortoises are at high risk of predation. Tegu lizards (Tupinambis species), ring-tailed coatis (Nasua nasua), and introduced rats and mongooses attack nests and eggs. Many predators take the young tortoises, including large lizards, snakes, crocodilians, and even large turtles; predatory birds such as the curassow (Crax species), guan (Penelope species), rails, cuckoos, and falcons; and mammals such as cats (Felidae species), opossums, foxes, peccaries, and feral dogs.

Other than humans, the main predators of the adult tortoises are jaguars (Panthera onca). Red-footed and yellow-footed tortoises seem to be a significant food source for jaguars in some parts of their respective ranges, such as Manú National Park in Peru. Jaguars bite at the carapace and work at cracking or prying it apart to extract the soft tissues. Many tortoises show toothmarks from attacks that they survived, often on the hind end when they were otherwise protected in a burrow or shelter.

=== Diet ===
Discussing the diet of the red-footed tortoise is difficult due to the wide variety of foods it eats, the variety and seasonal availability of plants available across the extensive range, interpreting what field reports are trying to describe, and because studying fecal pellets gives very different results from what the animals are observed eating.

Forest-dwelling tortoises in the Chelonoidis, Indotestudo, Manouria, and Kinixys genera are omnivores with upper and lower intestines about the same length, while herbivorous genera such as Gopherus and Testudo have longer large intestines to digest fibrous grasses. Most omnivorous tortoises have no other specialized digestive structures, reflecting their generalized, flexible diet.

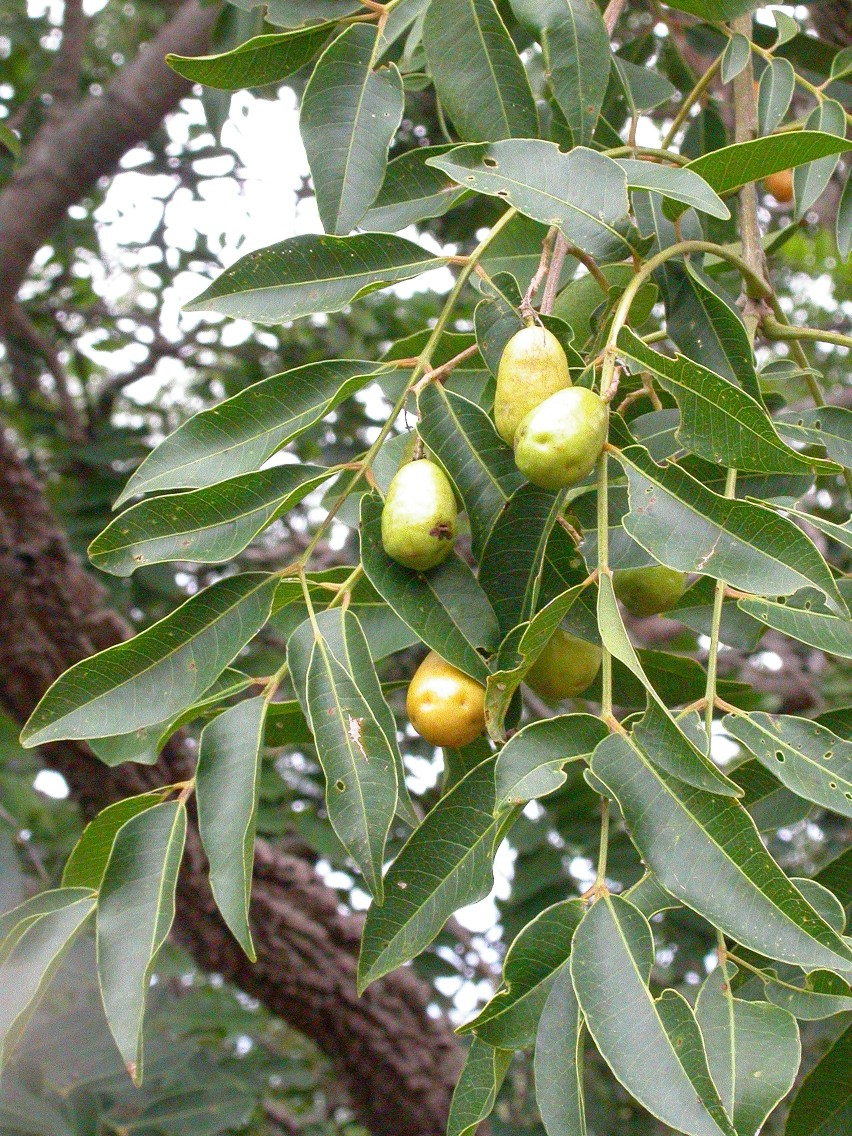
Spondias mombin fruits

The bulk of the diet is some sort of fruit or seed pod. Common fruits come from cacti (Opuntia), figs (Ficus), pehen (Acacia aroma), Spondias, Annona, Philodendron, bromeliads, and more. Up to five different kinds of fruits are often found in fecal pellets. The entire fruit is eaten, and the seeds are passed and can germinate, giving red- and yellow-footed tortoises a significant role in seed dispersal. Red-footed tortoises have been observed at the base of fruit trees, apparently waiting for fruit to fall.

The rest of the diet includes grasses, leaves, flowers, roots, and shoots from a wide assortment of plants as well as fungi, live invertebrates (such as ants, termites, beetles, butterflies, snails, and worms), carrion, and feces (especially from foxes). Tortoises are often found at carcasses feeding until gorged, and occasionally eat small live animals such as snakes and rodents. Pebbles and sand are also often found in fecal pellets.

The diet changes based on season and availability. In the wet season it may be roughly 70% fruit, 25% fresh leaves and shoots, and the rest being fungi and animal food. The dry season sees 40% fruits, 23% flowers, 16% fresh leaves and shoots, and the rest fungi, moss, and animal food.

Omnivorous tortoises seek out foods high in calcium even if other foods are more readily available, and even eat mineral-rich soil if they cannot get adequate calcium in the diet.

=== Movement ===
Red-foot tortoises forage over areas ranging from 0.63 to 117.5 hectares (1.6 to 290.3 acres) usually making a 'spiderweb' pattern centered on a good hide or a recent fruit fall. They generally move methodically around 5 to 20 m/hr (5.5-22 yd/hr), but can raise up on their long legs and move up to 100 m/hr (109 yd/hr) when they want. While they generally forage in zig-zag or looping patterns, they sometimes move 100 m (110 yd) or more in fairly straight lines, often at a rapid pace. They show a marked preference for moving under medium to dense vegetation cover.

=== Lifecycle ===
All turtles and tortoises start as eggs. Red-footed tortoise eggs are roughly spherical and average around 5.0 by 4.2 cm (2.0 by 1.7 in) and weigh 50 g (1.8 oz) with two to seven eggs in a clutch, although the same females may lay multiple clutches near each other. The incubation period is 105–202 days, with 150 being typical.

Hatchlings use an egg tooth to open the egg. They stay in the egg or nest for several days. Hatchling shells are bent almost in half in the egg and take some time to straighten out. The 3.6 by 6.3 cm (1.4 by 2.5 in) hatchling's carapace is flat, somewhat creased from being folded in the egg, and has serrated sides. Little is known of the daily activities or diet of hatchling wild tortoises. Subadult tortoises grow quickly to reach breeding sizes—roughly 20 to 25 cm (7.9 to 9.8 in), depending on the average adult size of the regional variant.

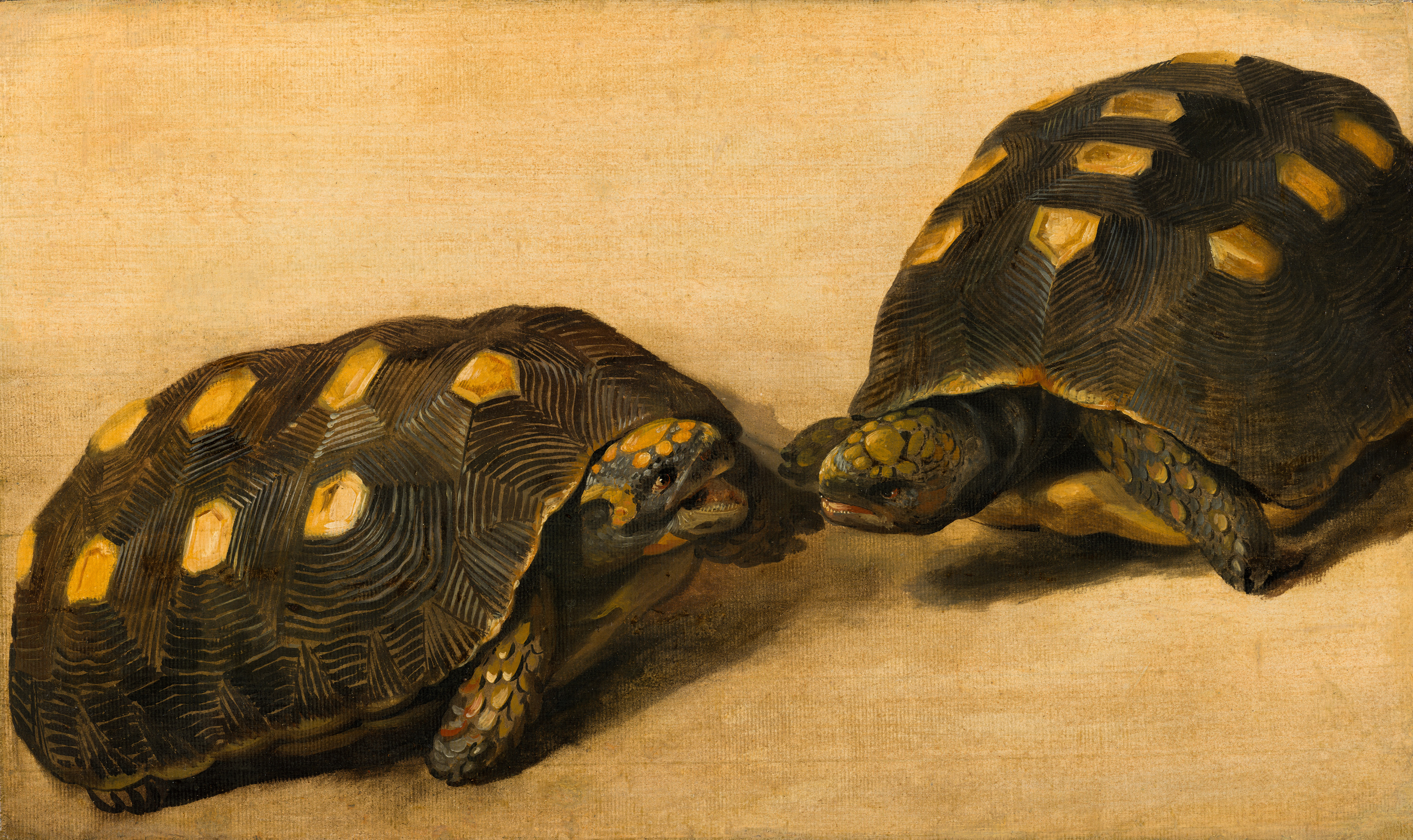
Illustration of red-footed tortoise combat by Albert Eckhout

The peak time for courtship and reproduction is the early wet season in April and May, although it can happen at any time. Courtship noises and possibly scent cues seem to attract other tortoises to 'courting sites' under fruiting trees such as Genipa. When two tortoises meet about a meter apart, they engage in some specific behaviors to identify the other. The first trigger is head and limb color; the bright red, orange, yellow, or white colors on the dark skin identify the other animal as the proper species. Next, the larger tortoise makes jerky side-to-side head movements for two to four seconds. If both tortoises are males, one will either withdraw and retreat, or they may try to ram each other, trying to get their gular scutes under the other one, then pushing them several meters away as quickly as possible. The defeated tortoise is sometimes flipped onto his back in the process. The defeated tortoise will leave the area afterwards. Neither head bobbing nor ritual combat have been observed in tortoises south of the Amazon Basin, possibly due to the lack of yellow-footed tortoises in the area. Males mounting other males, and even females mounting either sex have been witnessed and are thought to show dominance.

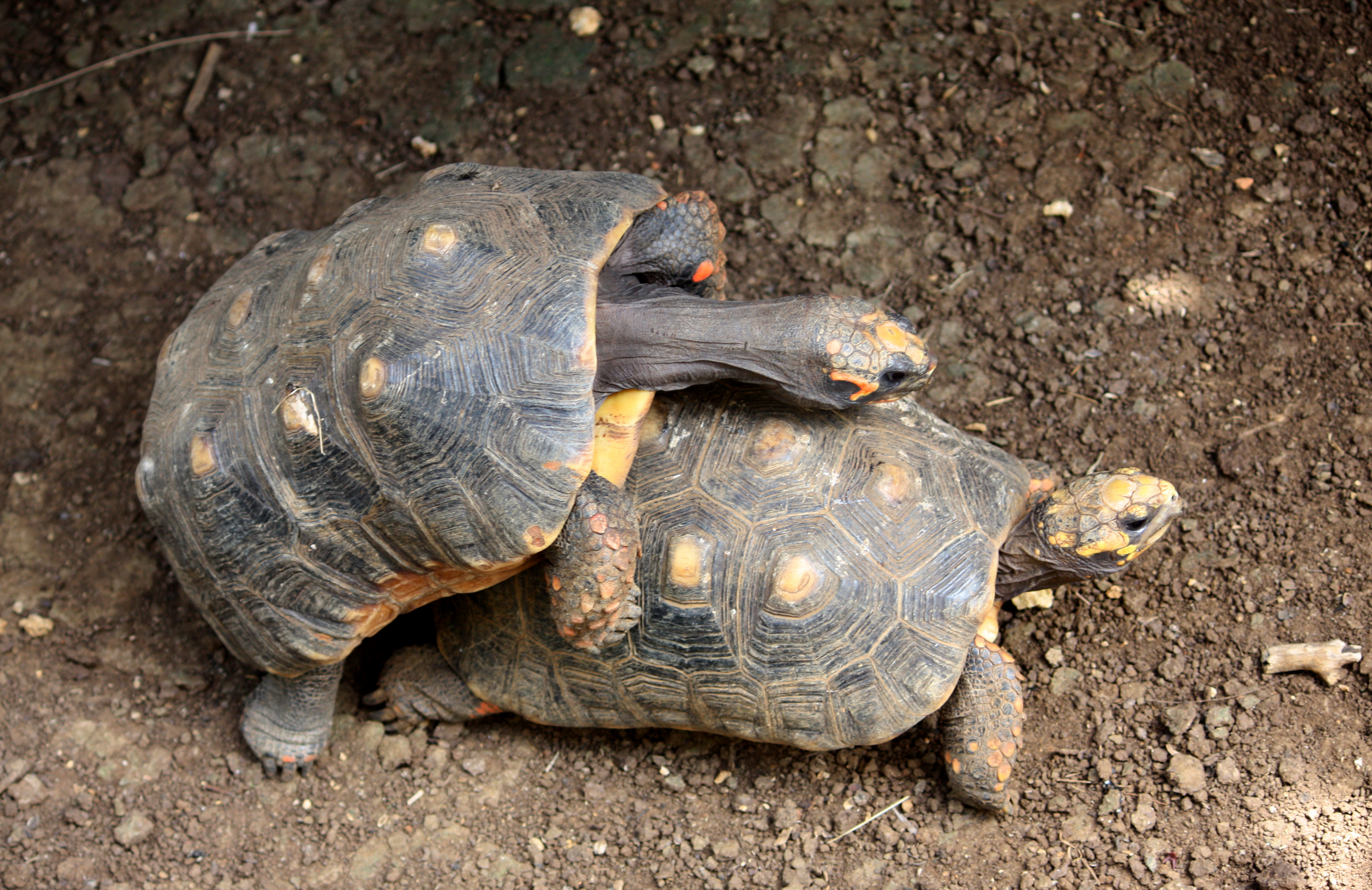
Red-footed tortoises mating in Barbados Wildlife Reserve

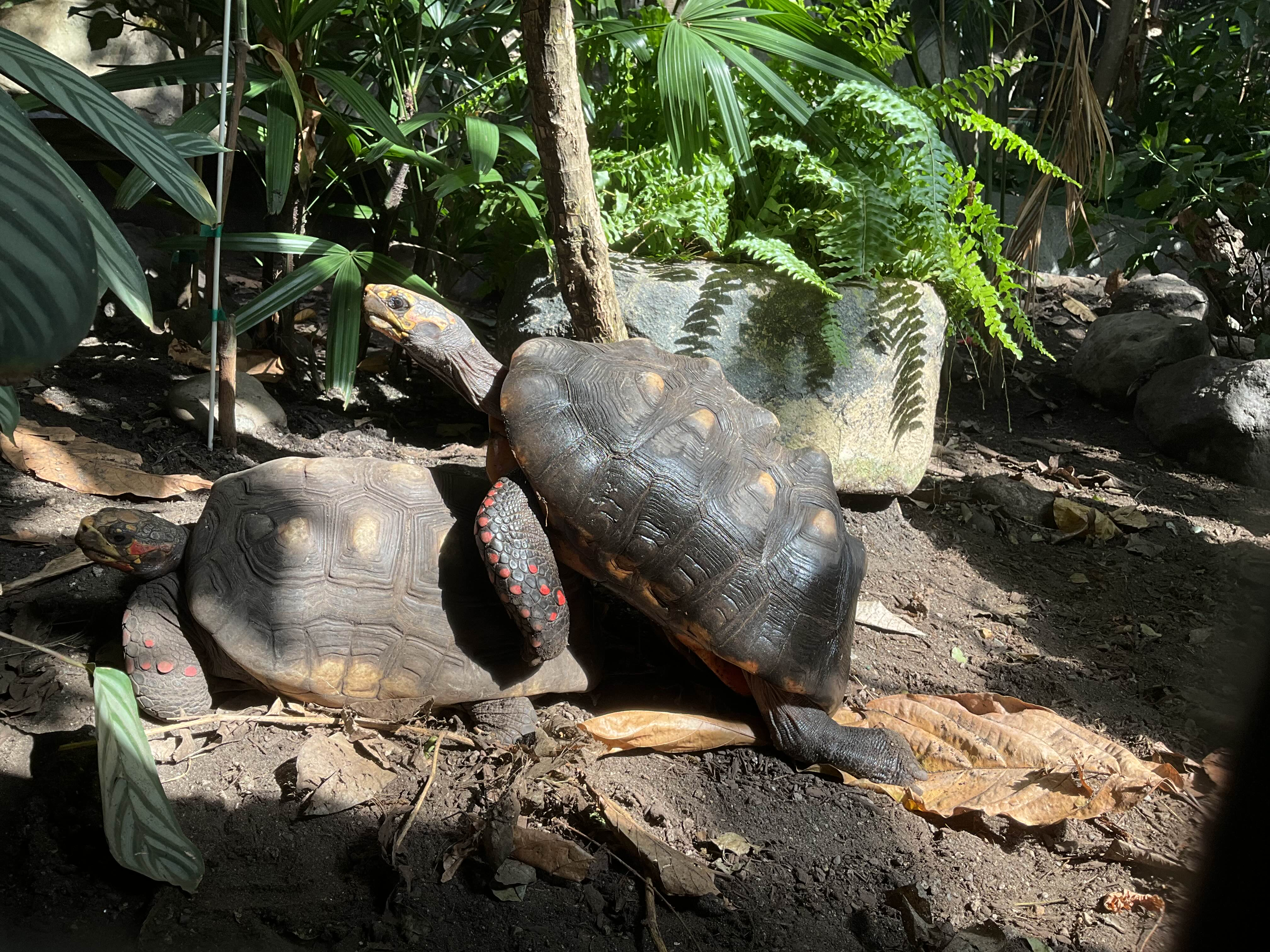
Mating, at the Vancouver Aquarium

If the other tortoise is a female, she will move away and the male will follow, touching her carapace and occasionally sniffing at her cloaca. If the female stops, the male may either wait for her to resume moving or leave. Males make loud 'clucking' sounds during the chase. After trailing, the male mounts the female, his feet planted on the costals of her carapace, rams his anal scutes against her supracaudal, and makes a loud raspy 'bark'. If the female resumes walking, he may fall off and resume trailing. Females sometimes seem to intentionally use low limbs to knock males off. A receptive female extends her hind legs and lifts her plastron as the male plants himself on his own extended hind legs as he works to align their cloacae for insertion. The tail, scutes, and penis of the tortoise are designed to work around the awkwardness of the shell. The male often leans his head over her head and holds his jaws wide open making calls that get louder. He may bite her, as well, sometimes quite aggressively. The shells can make loud clacking noises during the forceful thrusts. The female walks away after copulation, sometimes knocking the male off her.

The female begins nesting five to six weeks after mating. Digging the nests is often difficult in hard soil. The female may urinate to soften the soil before using her hind legs to dig a chamber about 10 by 20 cm (3.9 by 7.9 in) in about three and a half hours. Inexperienced females often dig several partial nests, and even experienced females may abandon a nest they are working on and start another. When the nest is ready, she lowers her tail as deep into the nest as she can and deposits an egg every 30 to 120 seconds. She recovers the nest and tamps the soil down. Females get better at digging, covering, and camouflaging nests over time. After it is covered and hidden, she often gets a long drink of water, then finds a shelter and rest. Very rarely, a red-footed tortoise lays eggs on the surface, or within a patch of cacti.

As with other tortoises, red-footed tortoises can reproduce most of their lives, although the number of eggs laid and the ratio of successful hatchlings improves as the tortoise matures, then drops off again as the tortoise ages. Because of the difficulty in determining the age of a wild tortoise, few data on longevity exist, although many live for 30 years or more in captivity.

== Conservation and relations with humans ==
The red-foot tortoise is considered a vulnerable species and is listed in CITES Appendix II, restricting international trade—although this does not offer protection within a country and smuggling still occurs in large numbers. Conservation parks and refuges, captive-breeding farms in natural conditions, and increased captive breeding in other countries has helped, but they are still exported in large numbers (35,565 from 2000 to 2005), mostly as pets and food. The recorded exports do not include smuggling or other losses, which some estimate to be well over twice that number. They are considered especially at risk in Argentina and Colombia, and are considered more at risk than both the yellow-footed tortoise, and Chaco tortoise.

They are widely used as food throughout their ranges, especially where other meats are limited. Their ability to go a long time without eating makes it easy to catch and keeps them fresh for extended periods. The Roman Catholic Church allows tortoises to be eaten on fasting days when most meats are forbidden, such as Lent. Tortoise pie (pastel de morrocoy, served in a tortoise shell) is a favorite food for those times, and large numbers of tortoises are exported just for that purpose. Even people living in countries with an abundance of available livestock enjoy wild game, such as tortoises, when possible. Hunting for food is so extensive that Colombia and some other countries import tortoises from neighbors.

Habitat destruction is another significant threat to the red-footed tortoise, and so many other species. They are also widely collected as local pets and their shells are sold as souvenirs.

== Captive care ==
Red-footed tortoises are popular species of tortoise to keep as pets all around the world. They are relatively inexpensive. Pet tortoises should be purchased as captive-bred from a reliable breeder, when possible, to both help protect wild populations and to avoid internal parasites.

Any reptile can carry Salmonella species, so keepers should practice proper hygiene, such as washing their hands after handling the animals or their wastes. Dogs, even well-behaved dogs, often attack or chew on tortoises, so great care must be taken if they are around.

=== Housing ===
All tortoises should be housed outdoors when conditions allow. Outdoor pens should allow space for exercise, secure walls that are at least 1.5 times taller than the tortoise is long, and security from both predators and escape. Shelter and water should always be provided.

Indoor housing is generally scaled to the size of the tortoise and must be secure and waterproof for this high-humidity species, as well as offering adequate space. Aquaria and plastic tubs are often used for younger tortoises, while a "tortoise table" (similar to shelf-less bookcase lying on its back), indoor minigreenhouse, or large indoor pen can be used for larger tortoises or groups of tortoises.

An indoor habitat should be lined with a substrate, such as hardwood mulches (like cypress), coconut coir, soil and sand mixes, or some combination. A hide and water dish are necessary, and live or silk plants also help.

=== Environment ===
Heat, light, and humidity must be kept within proper guidelines for healthy tortoises. Red-footed tortoises are most active at temperatures from 27 to 30 °C (81 to 86 °F). A warmer area of 30 to 31 °C (86 to 88 °F) is recommended, and night temperatures can drop a few degrees lower. High levels of humidity should be available in some part of the habitat.

Lighting should be low and diffuse or plenty of shade should be offered. Lights that emit UVB wavelengths are recommended to help the tortoise metabolize calcium correctly and help regulate the pineal gland if the tortoise will be indoors for extended periods.

=== Captive diet ===
Pet tortoises should be allowed to forage in a well-planted outdoor pen whenever possible. The basic diet should consist of a variety of plants, vegetables, and fruits with occasional meat, and be high in calcium and fiber, and low in sugars and fats. Fruits should be kept as whole as possible. Commercial tortoise pellets can be offered along with fresh foods.

The bulk of the diet should be leafy greens, such as turnip or collard greens, dandelion, leafy or curly lettuces, endive, kale, cabbage, edible tree or plant leaves, such as mulberry or hibiscus, lettuce mixes, parsley, grape leaves, etc.

Vegetables and fruits offer variety and other nutrients, but are a smaller part of the captive diet. Good choices would include: cactus pads and fruits, papaya, figs, mango, mushrooms, pumpkin, squash, melon, pineapple, strawberry, cucumber, hays and grasses (such as wheatgrass), corn, peas and beans, carrot, apple, pear, plums, and okra.

Meats form a very small part of the captive diet and can include live bugs or invertebrates (especially slugs), baby mice or rats, chicken, egg, organ meat, lean beef, tuna or other 'oily' fish, or cat or dog food.

Calcium should be supplemented frequently in very small amounts. Other vitamins can be offered in very small amounts as well, but are best provided through a balanced, varied diet.
