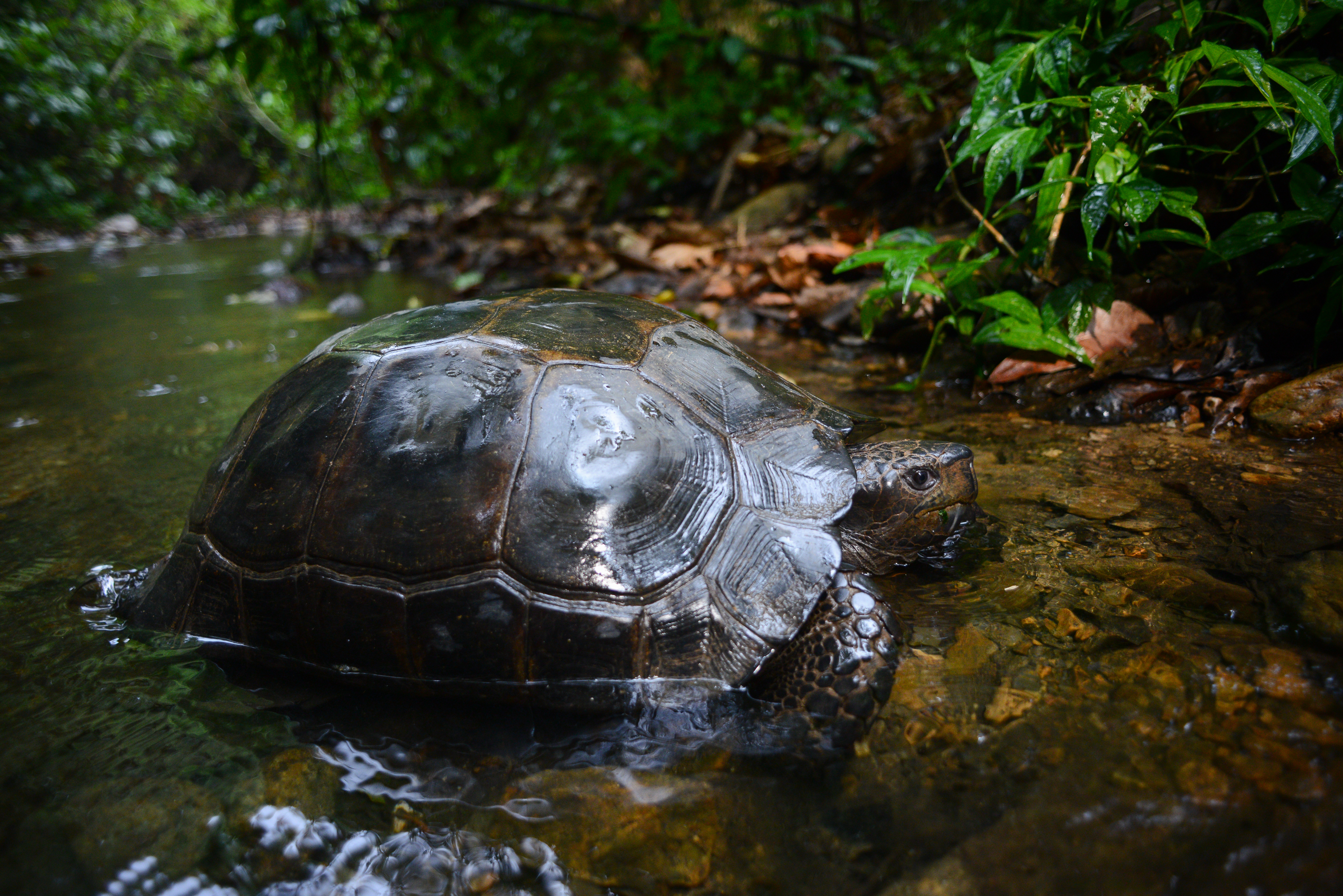
- Manouria emys

Scientific classification
- Kingdom: Animalia
- Phylum: Chordata
- Class: Reptilia
- Order: Testudines
- Suborder: Cryptodira
- Family: Testudinidae
- Genus: Manouria; Gray, 1854

Type species
- Manouria fusca Gray, 1854

= Manouria =

Manouria Temporal range: Burdigalian–Present

Genus of tortoises

Manouria is a genus of tortoises in the family Testudinidae. The genus was erected by John Edward Gray in 1854.

== Transitional adaptations ==
Manouria is either the most basal or second most basal member of the family Testudinidae (its phylogenetic position is adjacent to that of Gopherus). As a result, while tortoises are primarily terrestrial, the genus Manouria is a model for the evolutionary transition to terrestriality, as it still has an affinity for aquatic environments, and has retained some ancestral adaptations for an aquatic lifestyle while losing others. The Asian forest tortoise (Manouria emys) has been observed attempting to feed on submerged food items, albeit unsuccessfully. Additionally, the species grasps food item with its jaws as in aquatic or semiaquatic taxa, as opposed to first making contact with the tongue as with all other tortoise species (with the possible exception of Gopherus).

== Species ==
The following five species are recognized as being valid, two of which are extant, and three of which are extinct:

| Image | Common name | Scientific name | Distribution |
|---|---|---|---|
| | Asian forest tortoise | Manouria emys (Schlegel & S. Müller, 1844) | Bangladesh, Cambodia, India, Indonesia, Malaysia, Myanmar, Thailand, and Vietnam. |
| | impressed tortoise | Manouria impressa (Günther, 1882) | Myanmar, southern China, Thailand, Laos, Vietnam, Cambodia, Malaysia and Northeast India. |

- †Manouria sondaari Karl & Staesche, 2007 – a giant land tortoise from Luzon Island, Philippines however, Rhodin et al. (2015) transferred this species to the genus Megalochelys.
- †Manouria punjabiensis (Lydekker, 1889) – a fossil tortoise from Siwaliks, India
- †Manouria oyamai Takahashi, Otsuka & Hirayama, 2003 – a fossil tortoise from Ryukyu Islands, Japan
- †Manouria morla Chroust, Szczygielski & Luján, 2025 – early Miocene, Czech Republic

Nota bene: A binomial authority in parentheses indicates that the species was originally described in a genus other than Manouria.
