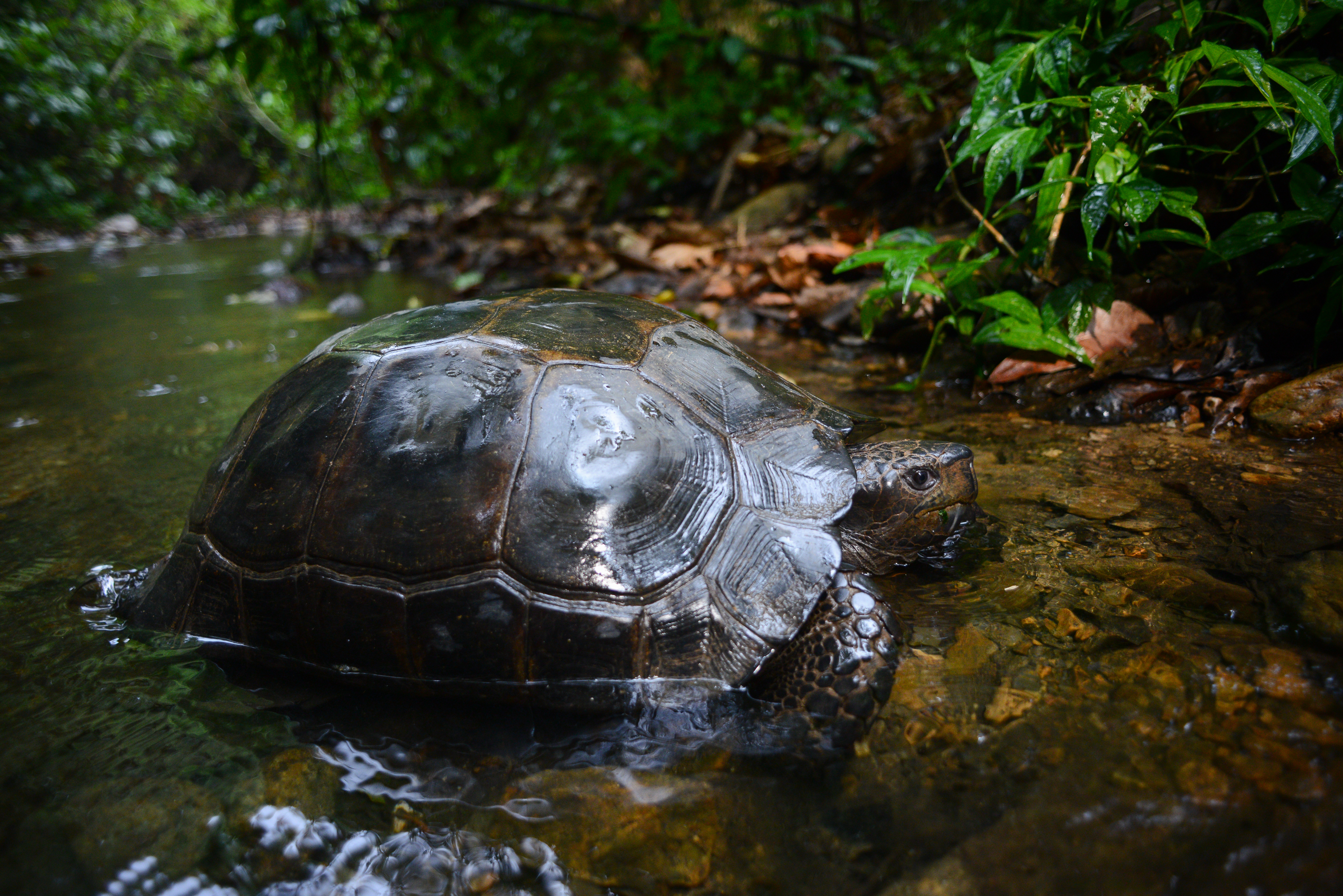
- Manouria emys from Kaeng Krachan National Park in Thailand

Conservation status
- Critically Endangered (IUCN 3.1)

Scientific classification
- Kingdom: Animalia
- Phylum: Chordata
- Class: Reptilia
- Order: Testudines
- Suborder: Cryptodira
- Family: Testudinidae
- Genus: Manouria
- Species: M. emys

Binomial name
- Manouria emys (Schlegel & S. Müller, 1844)

Synonyms
- List: Testudo emys emys; Testudo emys Schlegel & S. Müller, 1840; Testudo emydoides A.M.C. Duméril, Bibron & A.H.A. Duméril, 1851; Manouria fusca Gray, 1854; Teleopus luxatus LeConte, 1854; Manouria emydoides — Strauch, 1862; Manouria emys — Strauch, 1862; Manouria luxata — Strauch, 1862; Testudo (Scapia) falconeri Gray, 1869; Scapia falconeri — Gray, 1870; Manuria emys — Lydekker, 1889; Geochelone emys — Loveridge & E. Williams, 1957; Manouria emys emys — Obst, 1983; Geochelone emys emys — Gosławski & Hryniewicz, 1993; Testudo emys emys — Paull, 1999 Testudo emys phayrei; Testudo phayrei Blyth, 1853; Testudo (Scapia) falconeri — Gray, 1869; Scapia falconeri — Gray, 1870; Scapia phayrei — Gray, 1871; Testudo nutapundi Reimann, 1979; Geochelone nutapundi — Groombridge, 1982; Manouria emys nutapundi — Obst, 1983; Manouria emys phayrei — Bour, 1984; Geochelone (Manouria) emys phayeri Alderton, 1988 (ex errore); Geochelone emys nutapundi — Gosławski & Hryniewicz, 1993; Manouria nutapundi — Obst, 1996; Manouria emys phayeri — Paull, 1997; Manouria emys phayre Das, 2001 (ex errore); Manouria emys phareyi Ferri, 2002 (ex errore)

= Asian forest tortoise =

Species of tortoise

The Asian forest tortoise (Manouria emys) is a species of tortoise in the family Testudinidae. The species is endemic to Southeast Asia. It is believed to be among the most primitive of living tortoises, based on molecular and morphological studies.

== Taxonomy ==
There are two recognized subspecies: M. e. emys, which is native to southern Thailand, Malaysia, Sumatra, Borneo; and M. e. phayrei, which is found from northwestern Thailand to northeastern India. The latter was named after Sir Arthur Purves Phayre (1812–1885), British Army officer in India who became Commissioner of British Burma.

Based on a variety of phylogenetic characteristics, the genus Manouria is regarded as comparatively primitive and basal to other Testudinidae.

== Common names ==
Currently, the species has several common names. Asian/Burmese brown/black tortoise, Asian/Burmese forest tortoise, Asian/Burmese mountain tortoise, and Asian/Burmese Giant Tortoise are all modern day common names. Less commonly, the species may be known as the six-legged tortoise.

The two subspecies are generally referred to with different common names. "Asian", "Sundaic", "forest", "southern", and "brown" are more likely to be used to describe the M. e. emys subspecies. Adjectives such as "Burmese", "mountain", "northern", and "black" generally describe M. e. phayrei.

In older literature, this species may be referred to by different names. When the species was first described, it was named Testudo emys, and the subspecies T. e. phayrei was called Testudo phayrei. Other synonymous older names include Geochelone nutapundi, Testudo emys, and Manuria emys.

== Description ==
M. emys is the largest tortoise in mainland Asia. The largest adults of the northern subspecies (M. e. phayrei) can reach 25 kg (55 lb) in the wild and much more in captivity. It has a broad, flattened upper shell and a large lower shell, with distinctive features on its head, limbs, and skin that set it apart from other tortoises.

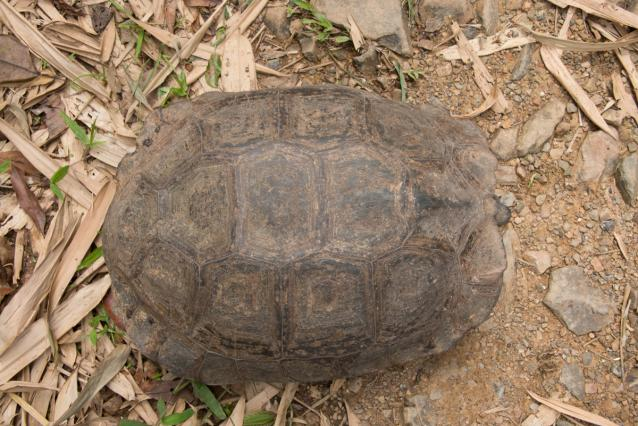
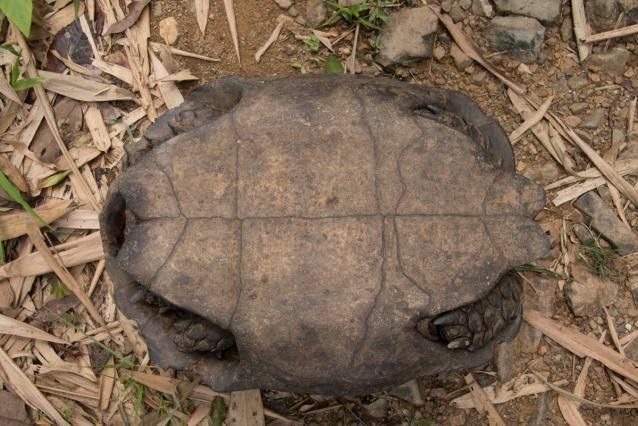
View of carapace and plastron at Kaeng Krachan National Park, in Thailand.

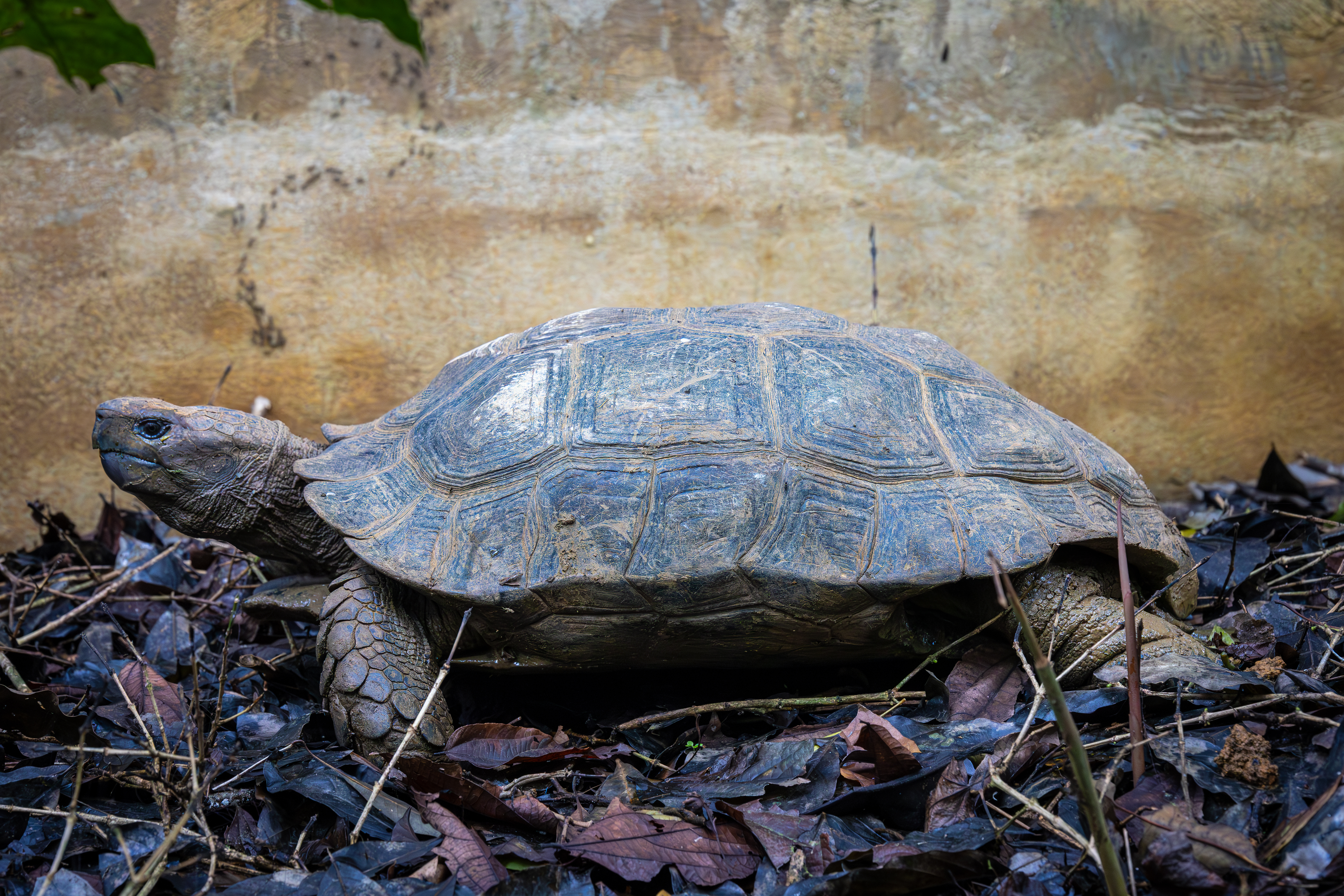
In Vietnam

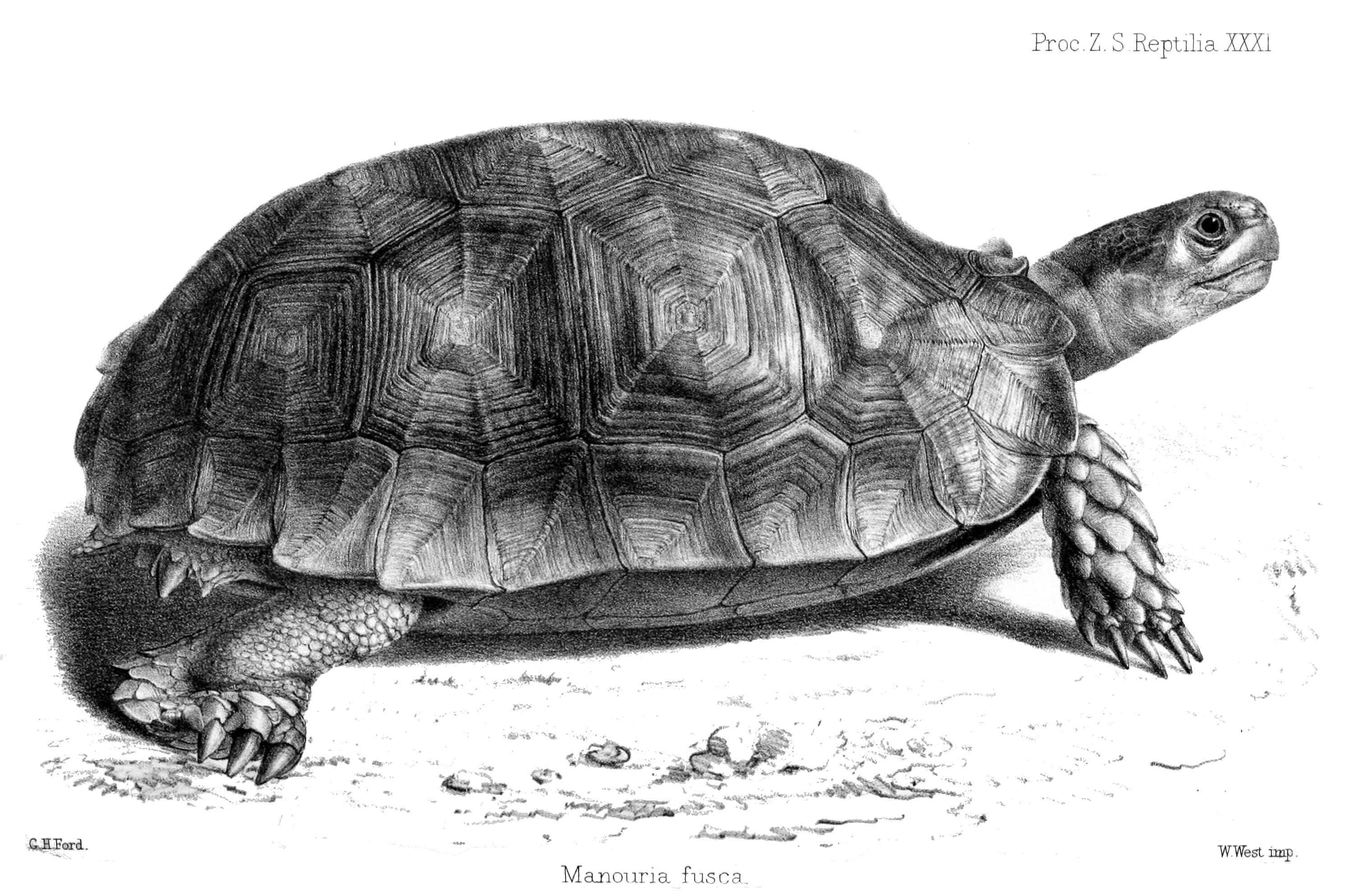
Illustration by George Henry Ford

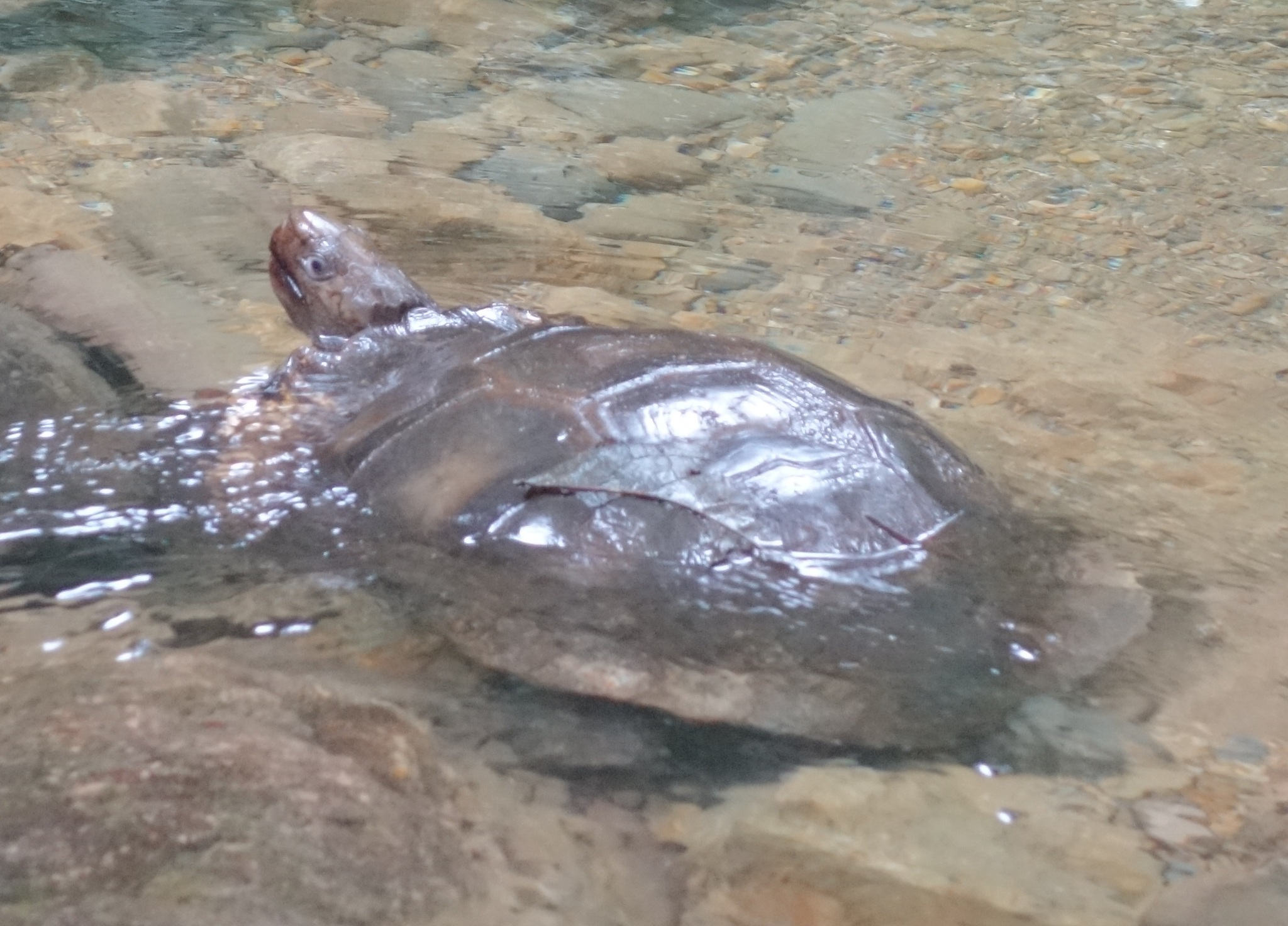
Underwater, in Sumatra

The carapace is considerably depressed (flattened), its depth less than half its length. Anterior and posterior margins are reverted (upturned) and strongly serrated (toothed). A nuchal (neck) shield is present, along with two supracaudal (above the tail) shields. Dorsal shields show concentric striations (grooves) and are often concave. Vertebral shields are much broader than long and at least as broad as costals (side plates). The lower shell (plastron) is large, with the gular region (throat area) produced (slightly extended) and typically notched (indented). The hind lobe (rear section) is deeply notched (indented). Pectoral shields may be widely separated or joined by a short median suture (seam). The axillary (armpit) shield is very small, while the inguinal (groin) shield is large. The head is moderate in size, featuring two large prefrontal shields and a large frontal shield. The beak is not hooked. Jaws are feebly denticulated (weakly toothed), with a strong median ridge (raised line) on the upper jaw's alveolar surface (inner surface). Anterior forelimb surfaces have large, bony, pointed, imbricate tubercles (overlapping bumps) in four or five longitudinal series. Hind limbs bear large bony tubercles (bumps) on the plantar surface (sole), with larger, conical, spur-like tubercles (bumps) on the heel and a group of even larger conical tubercles (bumps) on each side of the thighs' posterior. Adults are dark brown or blackish. Juveniles have a yellowish-brown carapace with dark-brown markings.

== Distribution ==
M. emys occurs in countries across Asia, which includes Bangladesh, Cambodia, India, Indonesia, Malaysia, Myanmar, Thailand, and Vietnam.

== Diet ==
This species has been observed in the wild to consume whole fungi, shoots of koster's curse (Miconia crenata), leaves and petioles of elephant ears (Alocasia sarawakensis and Alocasia scabriuscula), shoots of Begonia sp., shoots of Phrynium sp., shoots of vegetable fern (Diplazium esculentum), and flowers of wild ginger (Etlingera coccinea). Most commonly eaten were plants of the genus Alocasia, with individuals observed standing nearly vertical to reach leaves. In captivity, individuals have accepted a wide variety of food, predominantly being herbivorous but occasionally consuming frogs, snails, or carrion when presented.

== Reproduction ==
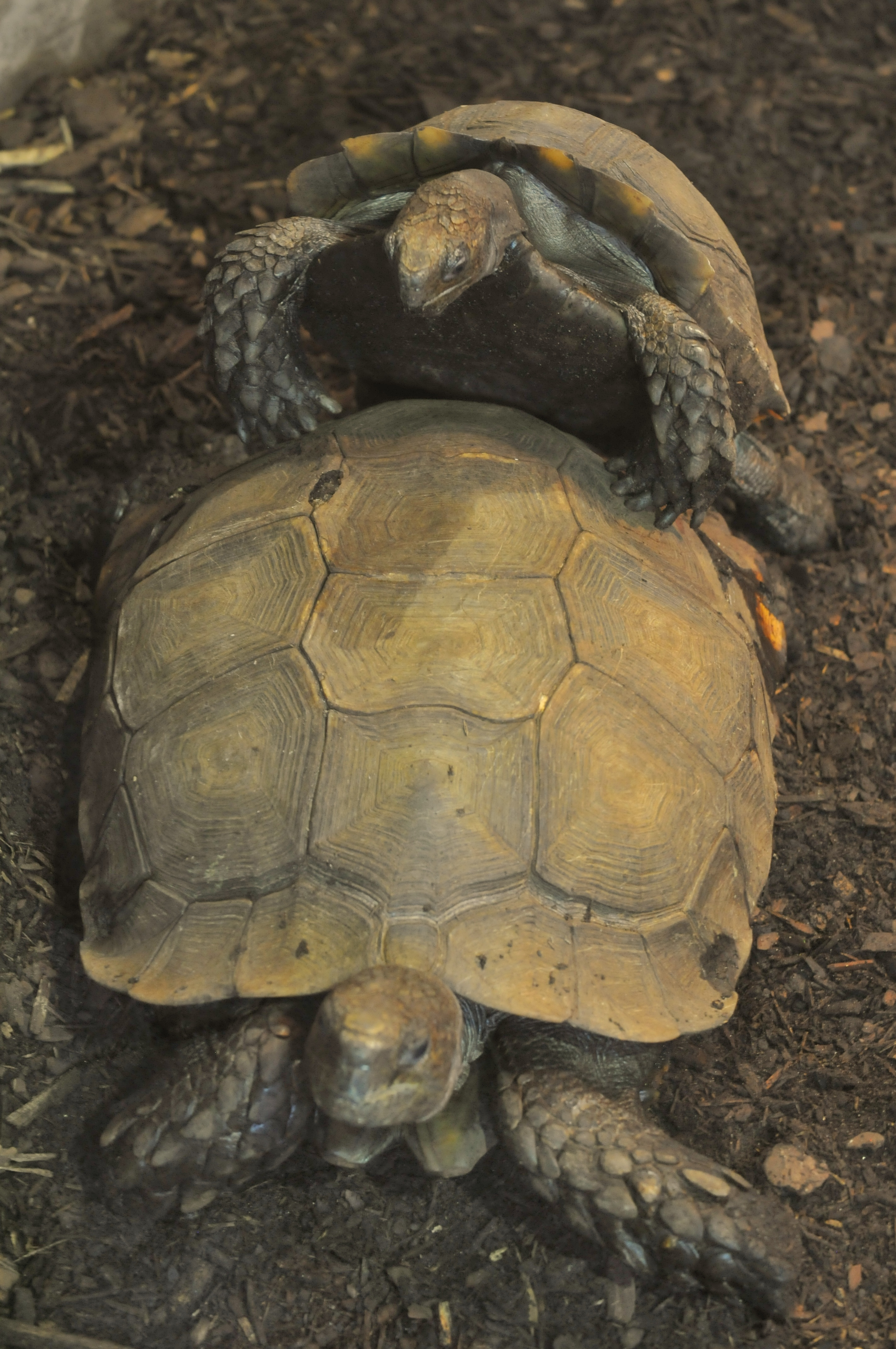
Mating at the Toronto Zoo

M. emys is the only tortoise which lays its eggs above ground in a nest, which the female constructs of leaf litter. The female uses both front and rear legs to gather material for the nest and lays up to 50 eggs deep inside it. She then sits on and near the nest to protect it, and will "chase" predators and intruders away.

Preliminary research has been conducted into Temperature-Dependent Sex Determination (TSD) in the southern subspecies (M. e. emys), and an estimated pivotal temperature of 29.29°C was determined. Incubation temperatures higher than this produce high rates of female hatchlings, and lower than this produce high rates of males.

A correlation was also seen between temperature and incubation time, with higher temperatures resulting in a shorter incubation time, and lower temperatures resulting in a longer incubation time. Incubation time ranged from 60 to 90 days.
