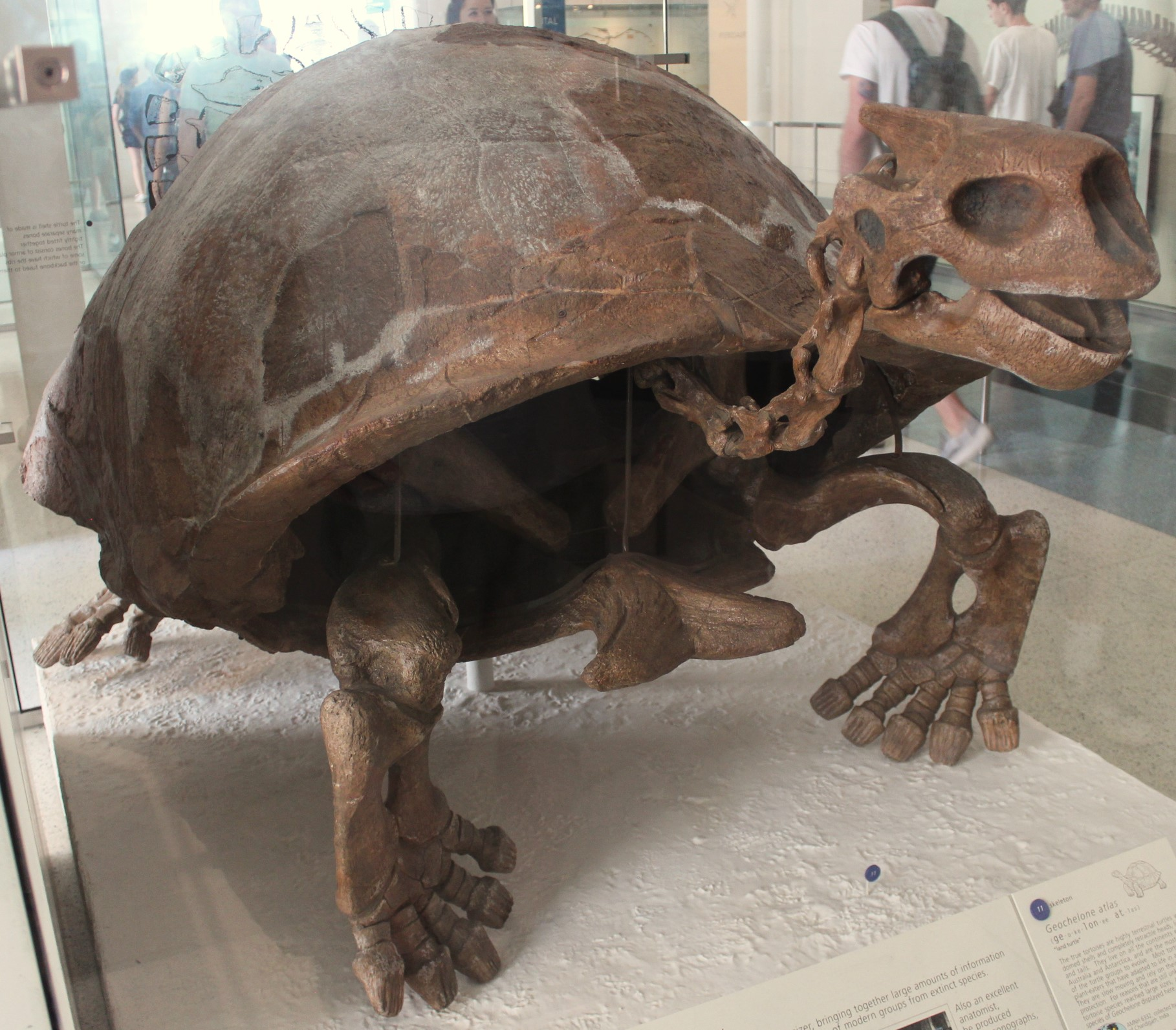
- M. atlas skeleton at the American Museum of Natural History

Scientific classification
- Kingdom: Animalia
- Phylum: Chordata
- Class: Reptilia
- Order: Testudines
- Suborder: Cryptodira
- Family: Testudinidae
- Genus: †Megalochelys; Falconer & Cautley, 1837

Type species
- Megalochelys atlas (Falconer and Cautley, 1844)

Species
- See text

Synonyms
- Colossochelys Falconer & Cautley, 1844

= Megalochelys =

Megalochelys Temporal range: Late Miocene–Middle Pleistocene

Extinct genus of tortoises

Megalochelys ("great turtle") is an extinct genus of tortoises that lived from the Miocene to Pleistocene. They are noted for their giant size, the largest known for any tortoise, with a maximum carapace length of over 2 m (6.5 ft) in M. atlas. The genus ranged from western India and Pakistan to as far east as Sulawesi and Timor in Indonesia, though the island specimens likely represent distinct species.

== Description ==
One species of Megalochelys, M. atlas, is the largest known tortoise, with shells of 2 m (6 ft 7 in) in length having been reported. Popular weight estimates for this taxon have varied greatly with the highest estimates reaching up to 4,000 kg (8,800 lb) in some instances. However, weights based on volumetric displacement of the skeleton suggest a mass of around 1,000 kg (2,200 lb). M. atlas is thus the largest known tortoise. Some island species were considerably smaller, with the Philippine species Megalochelys sondaari only having a carapace length of 70–90 cm (2 ft 4 in – 2 ft 11 in). The shell of Megalochelys is prominently domed, proportionally wide, with large openings for the limbs, and is relatively thin despite its size, though the epiplastron (the frontmost-portion of the lower carapace) was forked and very thick. Such forked epiplastra are found in some living tortoises, where they are used for combat and shoving contests between males. The skull of Megalochelys could grow over 30 cm (0.98 ft) in length, and had a deep nasal region and a deep and rather short snout, similar to living Aldabra giant tortoises.

== Taxonomy ==
The genus Megalochelys was first named in 1837 Hugh Falconer and Proby Cautley based on remains found in the Sivalik Hills of northern India with species Megalochelys sivalensis. However, later in 1844, Falconer and Cautley decided to rename the species Colossochelys atlas as they considered the original name "not to convey a sufficiently expressive idea of the size". During the late 19th century and much of the 20th century, Megalochelys/Colossochelys was considered synonymous with Testudo, and later Geochelone. Today, Colossochelys is regarded as a junior synonym of Megalochelys. The original species name M. sivalensis is regarded as a nomen nudum due to lacking a proper description (though the genus name is valid due to differing ICZN standards on the naming of genera and species) making M. atlas, which was accompanied by a proper description, the valid name for this species, though some authors have argued for the validity of Megalochelys sivalensis.

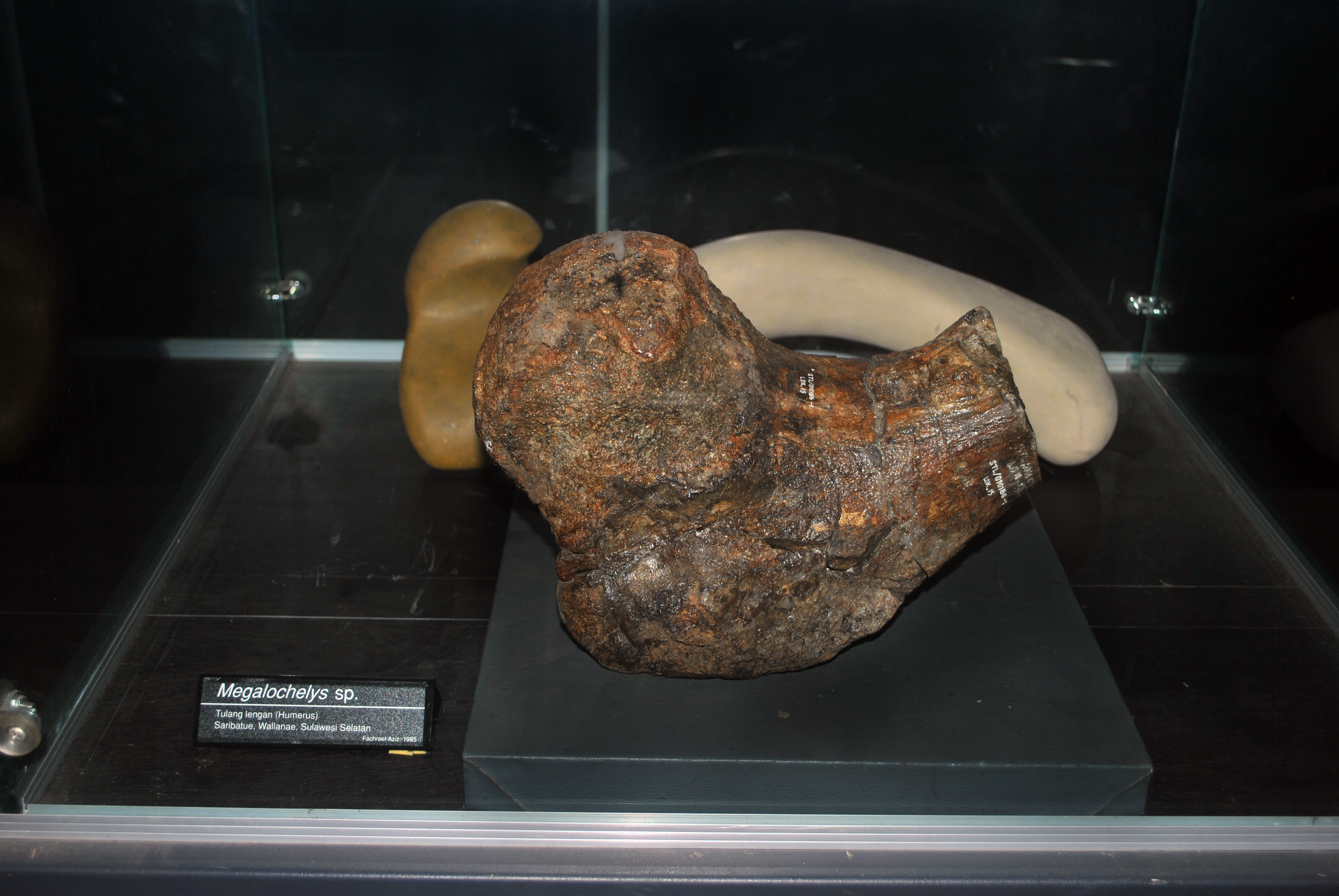
M. margae fossilized humerus bone from Saribatue, Wallanae river, South Sulawesi

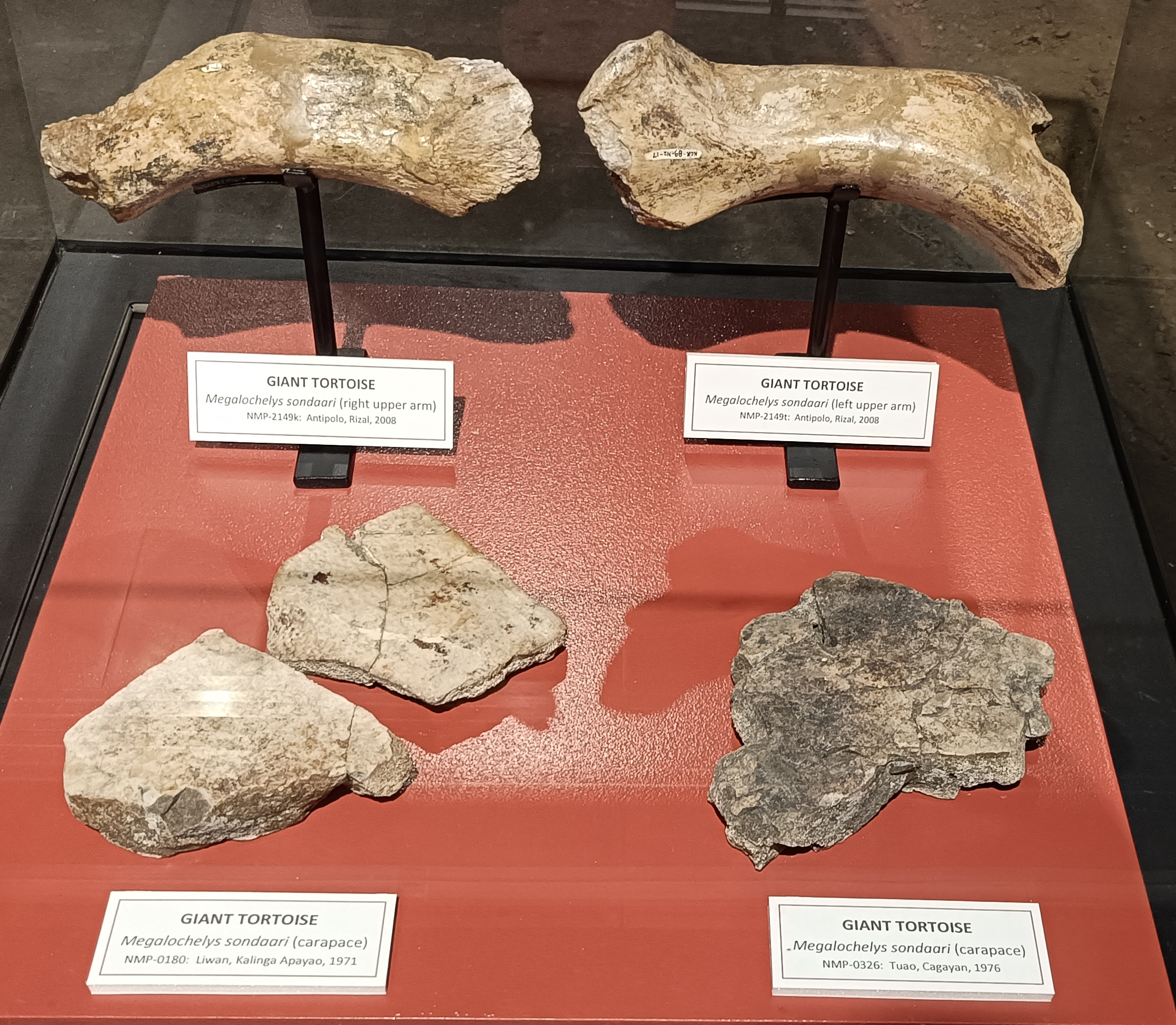
Fossils of the M. sondaari, from the National Museum of Natural History (Manila)

Megalochelys is the original and valid name for what has been called Colossochelys. It contains three named species with several unnamed taxa.

- Megalochelys atlas Falconer and Cautley, 1844 Late Miocene to Early Pleistocene, India (Sivalik Hills), Myanmar, ?Thailand
- Megalochelys cautleyi Lydekker, 1889 Late Pliocene to Early Pleistocene, India (Sivalik Hills) probable nomen dubium.
- Megalochelys margae Early Pleistocene, Sulawesi, Indonesia. Size estimation between 1.4-1.9 m long.
- Megalochelys sondaari Karl and Staesche, 2007 Early Pleistocene (until 1.7 ma) Luzon, Philippines
- Megalochelys sp. Middle-Late Pleistocene (about 0.8-0.12 Mya) Timor, Indonesia
- Megalochelys sp. Early Pleistocene (until 1.2 Mya) Java, Indonesia
- Megalochelys sp. Early Pleistocene (1.4-1.3 Mya) Flores, Indonesia

Cladistic analysis has suggested that Megalochelys' closest living relative is Centrochelys (the African spurred tortoise), with both also being closely related to Geochelone (the star tortoises).

== Extinction ==
The genus is suspected to have gone extinct due to the arrival of Homo erectus, due to staggered extinctions on islands coinciding with the arrival of H. erectus in these regions, as well as evidence of exploitation by H. erectus. The genus was largely extinct by the end of the Early Pleistocene, but persisted on Timor into the Middle Pleistocene.

== See also ==
- Titanochelon, a similarly giant tortoise known from the Miocene-Early Pleistocene of Europe
- Archelon, a Late Cretaceous marine turtle and the largest turtle yet discovered
- Stupendemys, the largest freshwater turtle to have ever lived, comparable in size to Megalochelys atlas
