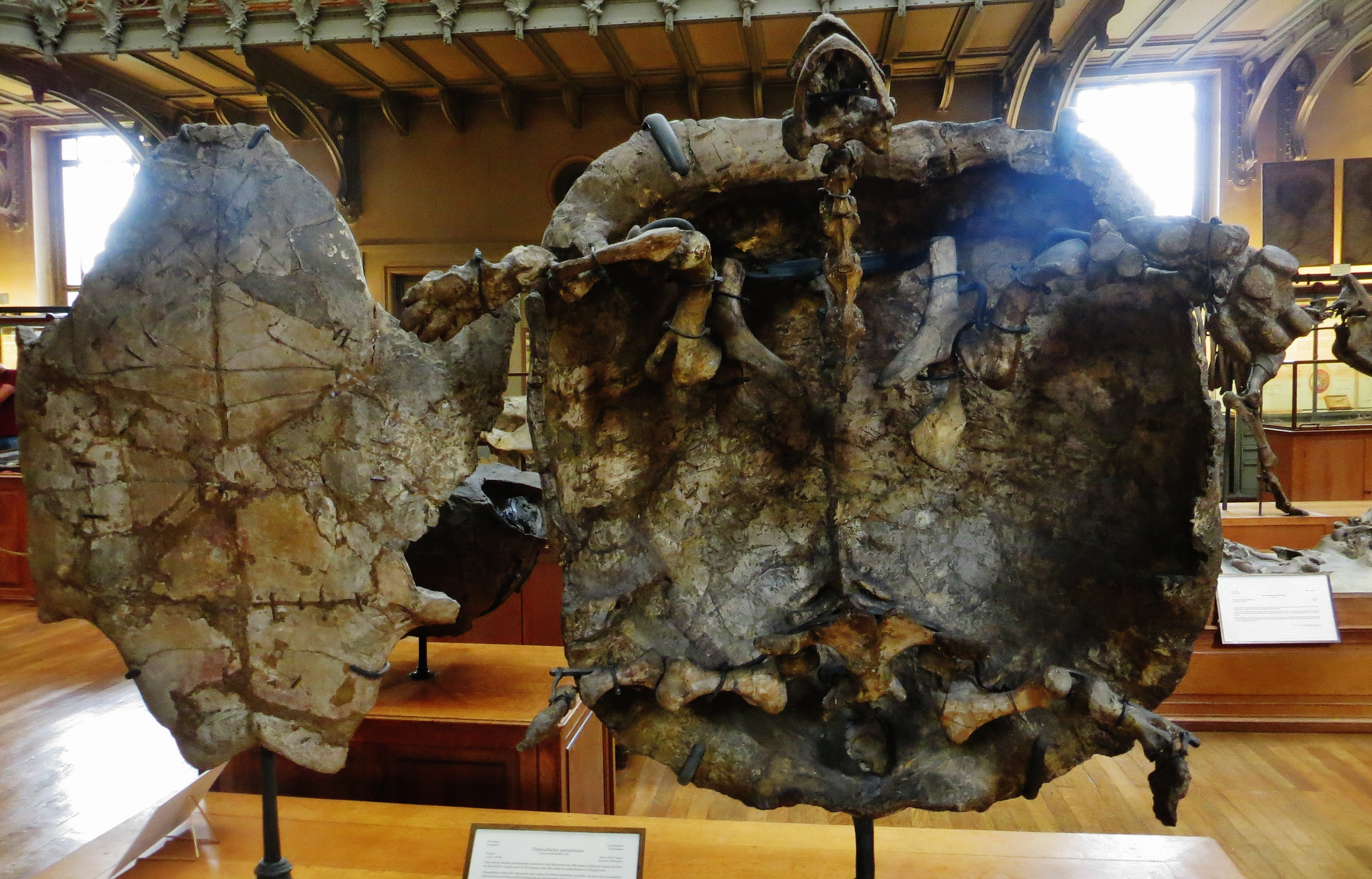
- Titanochelon perpiniana
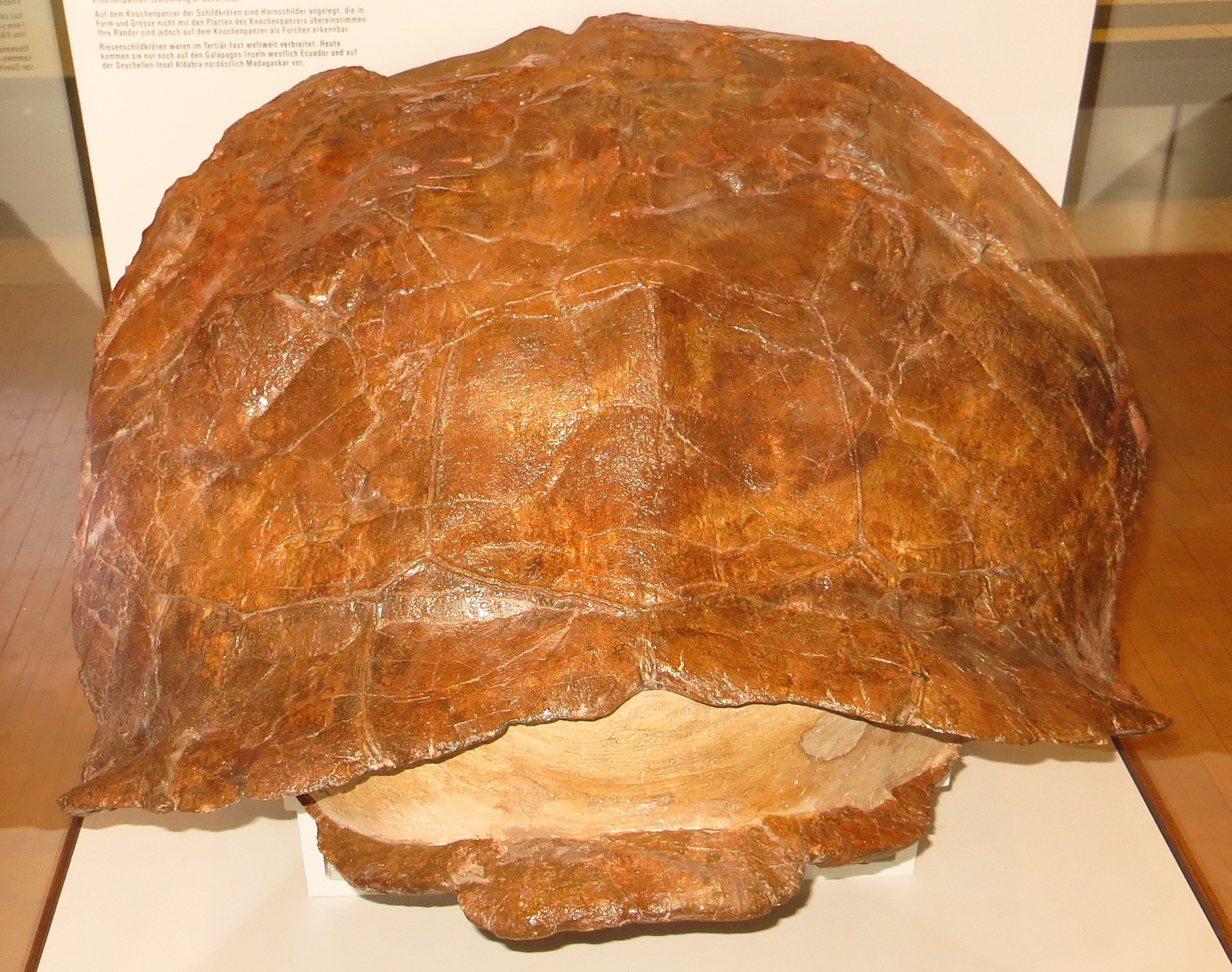
- Shell of Titanochelon vitodurana

Scientific classification
- Kingdom: Animalia
- Phylum: Chordata
- Class: Reptilia
- Order: Testudines
- Suborder: Cryptodira
- Family: Testudinidae
- Genus: †Titanochelon; Pérez-García and Vlachos, 2014.

Type species
- Titanochelon bolivari (Hernandez-Pacheco, 1917)

Species
- See text

= Titanochelon =

Titanochelon Temporal range: Early Miocene–Early Pleistocene

Genus of tortoises

Titanochelon is an extinct genus of giant tortoises known from the Early Miocene to the beginning of the Pleistocene in Europe, extending from the Iberian Peninsula to Anatolia, as well as possibly North Africa. Some members of the genus were larger than extant giant tortoises, with a shell length of up to 2 m (6 ft 7 in).

== Taxonomy ==
There are approximately 10 known species in the genus, most of which were originally assigned to Testudo (a genus which formally encompassed almost all fossil tortoises) or Cheirogaster, the type species of which, Cheirogaster maurini is known from the Eocene of France and is quite different to the species assigned to Titanochelon. After a major systematic revision in 2014, the genus Titanochelon was created to house these related species.

- † Titanochelon bolivari (Hernandez-Pacheco, 1917) (type) Iberian Peninsula, Miocene
- † Titanochelon bacharidisi (Vlachos et al., 2014) Greece, Bulgaria, Late Miocene
- † Titanochelon perpiniana (Deperet 1885) France, Pliocene
- †Titanochelon schafferi (Szalai, 1931) Samos, Greece, Miocene
- †Titanochelon vitodurana (Biedermann 1862) Switzerland, Early Miocene
- †Titanochelon kayadibiensis Karl, Staesche & Safi, 2021, Anatolia, Miocene
- †Titanochelon eurysternum (Gervais, 1848–1852) France, Miocene
- †Titanochelon ginsburgi (de Broin, 1977 ) France, Miocene
- †Titanochelon leberonensis (Depéret, 1890) France, Miocene
- †Titanochelon schleichi Pappa, Vlachos & Moser, 2023, Germany, Miocene (Burdigalian/Langhian boundary)

The giant tortoise species "Testudo" gymnesica Bate, 1914 from the Lower Pliocene-Lower Pleistocene of the Balearic Islands was formerly suggested to be possibly attributable to this genus, but the taxon displays notable differences from the species assigned to Titanochelon. Remains from the Pleistocene of Malta were also considered possibly attributable to this genus. In 2022, "Testudo" gymnesica and the Maltese species were assigned to the new genus Solitudo.

In 2025, "Testudo" punica Arambourg, 1979 from the Early Pliocene of Ichkeul, Tunisia was suggested to be closely related and possibly belonging to Titanochelon, and was tentatively assigned to the genus as "Titanochelon" punicum.

== Evolutionary history ==
Phylogenetic analyses have recovered Titanochelon as most closely related to Stigmochelys (the leopard tortoise), which is native to Africa, suggesting the genus has an African origin. Fossils have been recovered from across Europe beginning in the Early Miocene from Portugal, Spain, France, Switzerland, Germany, Austria, the Czech Republic, Greece, Bulgaria, and Anatolia. The youngest known definitive remains of the genus are known from the Early Pleistocene Fonelas P-1 site of Granada in southern Spain, dating to around 2.0 million years ago. Their extinction was likely related to climatic cooling due to the onset of glaciation at the beginning of the Pleistocene.
