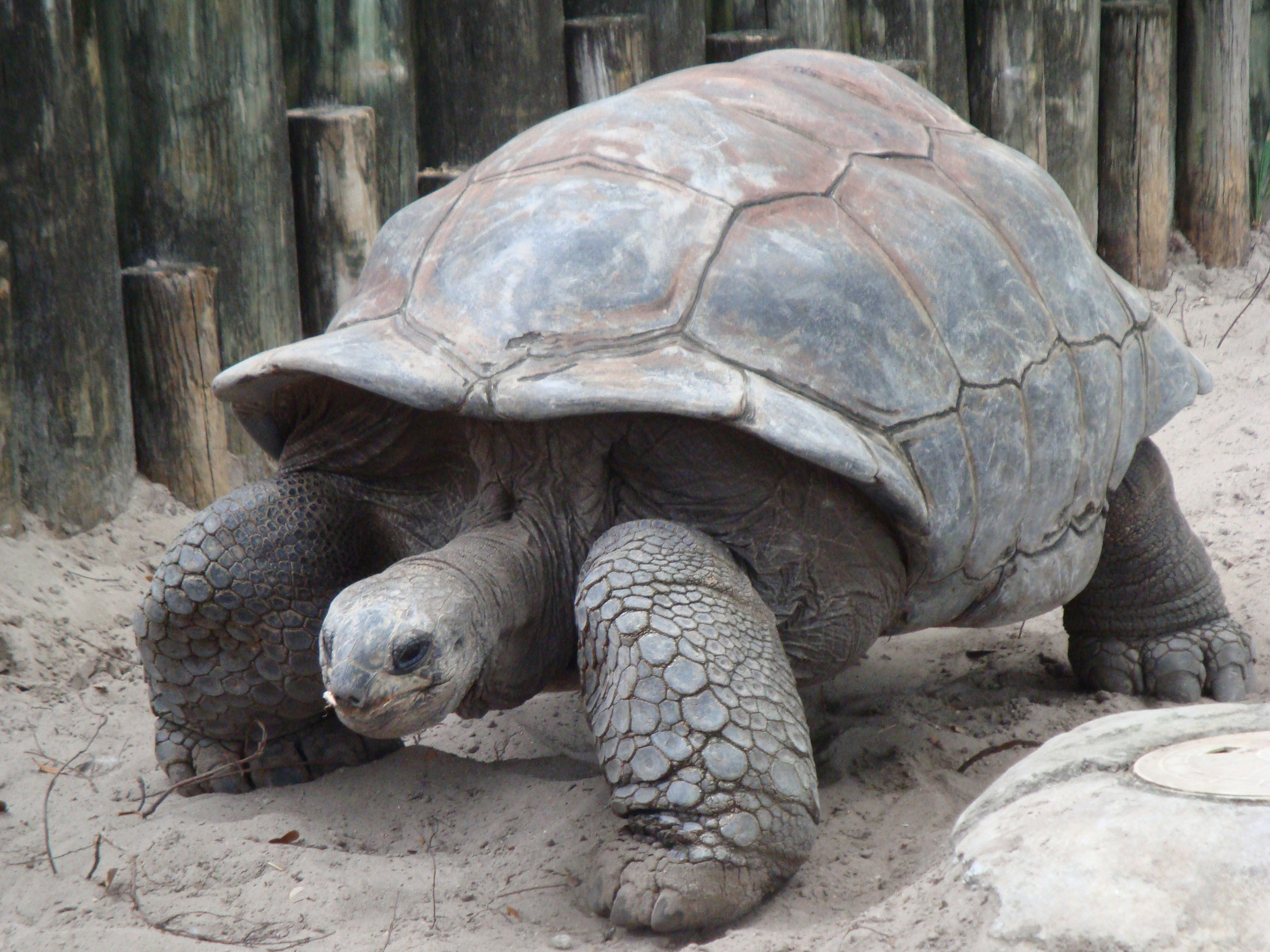
- Aldabra giant tortoise (Aldabrachelys gigantea)

Scientific classification
- Kingdom: Animalia
- Phylum: Chordata
- Class: Reptilia
- Order: Testudines
- Suborder: Cryptodira
- Superfamily: Testudinoidea
- Family: Testudinidae; Batsch, 1788

Type genus
- Testudo Linnaeus, 1758
- Testudinidae distribution

= Tortoise =

Testudinidae Temporal range: Eocene –Recent

Family of land turtles

Tortoises (/ˈtɔːrtəs.ɪz/ TOR-təs-iz) are reptiles of the family Testudinidae of the order Testudines (Latin for "tortoise"). Like other testudines, tortoises have a shell to protect from predation and other threats. The shell in tortoises is generally hard, and like other members of the suborder Cryptodira, they retract their necks and heads directly backward into the shell to protect them.

Tortoise species vary widely in size. Some, such as the Galápagos giant tortoise, grow to more than 1.2 metres (3.9 ft) in length, whereas others like the speckled Cape tortoise have shells that measure only 6.8 centimetres (2.7 in) long. Several lineages of tortoises have independently evolved very large body sizes in excess of 100 kilograms (220 lb), including the Galapagos giant tortoise and the Aldabra giant tortoise. They are usually diurnal animals with tendencies to be crepuscular depending on the ambient temperatures. They are generally reclusive animals. Tortoises are the longest-living land animals in the world, although the longest-living species of tortoise is a matter of debate. Galápagos tortoises are noted to live over 150 years, but an Aldabra giant tortoise named Adwaita may have lived an estimated 255 years. In general, most tortoise species can live 80–150 years. Tortoises are typically slow-moving, placid and gentle.

In 1968, two Russian tortoises aboard Zond 5 were the first Earthlings to travel to and circle the Moon. They were also the first Earthlings to travel beyond low-Earth orbit and the first to return safely from a Moon mission.

== Terminology ==
Differences exist in usage of the common terms turtle, tortoise, and terrapin, depending on the variety of English being used; usage is inconsistent and contradictory. These terms are common names and do not reflect precise biological or taxonomic distinctions.

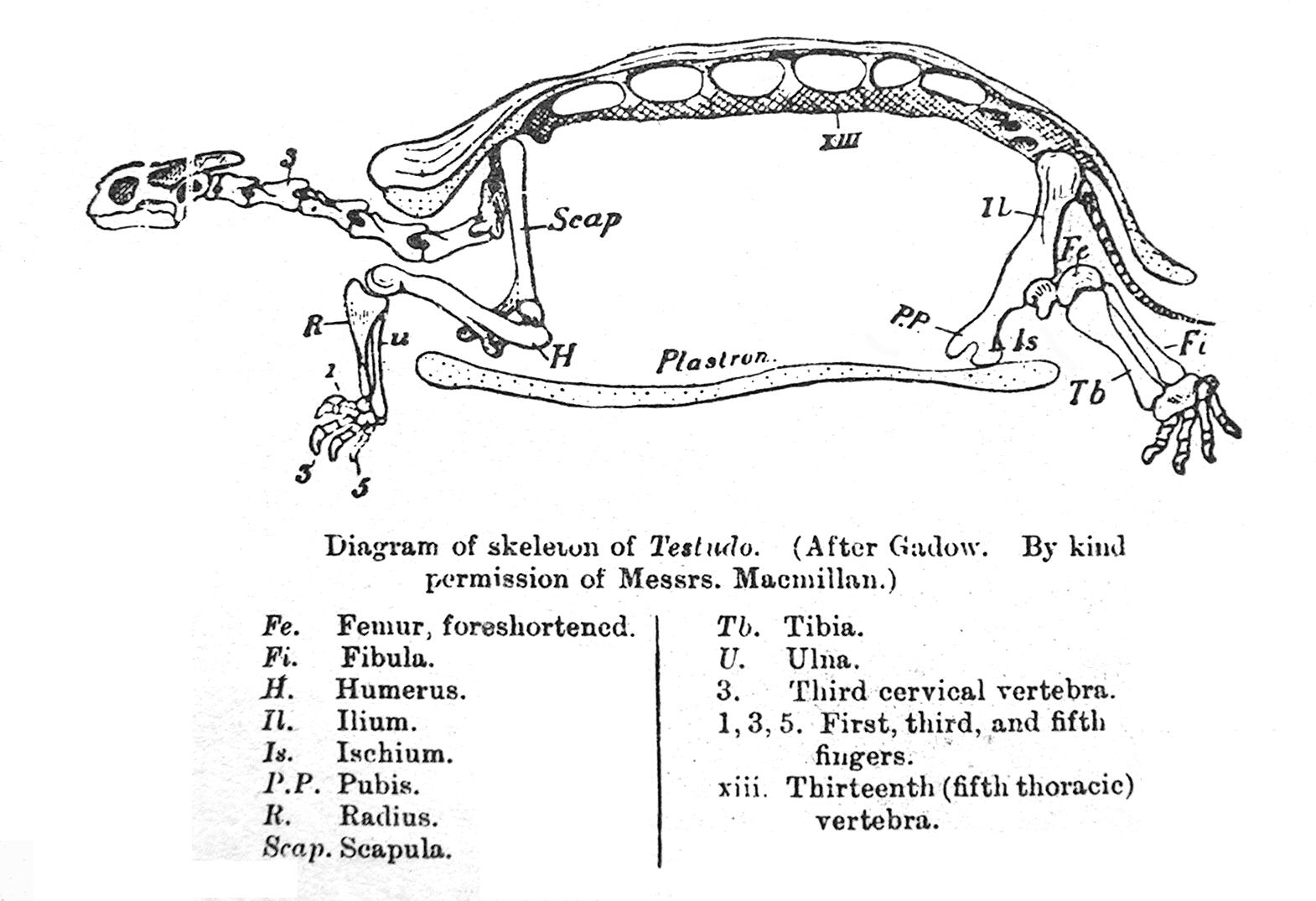
Skeleton of a tortoise

The American Society of Ichthyologists and Herpetologists uses "turtle" to describe all species of the order Testudines, regardless of whether they are land-dwelling or sea-dwelling, and uses "tortoise" as a more specific term for slow-moving terrestrial species. General American usage agrees; turtle is often a general term; tortoise is used only in reference to terrestrial turtles or, more narrowly, only those members of Testudinidae, the family of modern land tortoises; and terrapin may refer to turtles that are small and live in fresh and brackish water, in particular the diamondback terrapin (Malaclemys terrapin). In America, for example, the members of the genus Terrapene dwell on land, yet are referred to as box turtles rather than tortoises.

British and International English usage, by contrast, tends not to use "turtle" as a generic term for all members of the order, and applies the term "tortoises" broadly to all land-dwelling members of the order Testudines, regardless of whether they are actually members of the family Testudinidae. In Britain, terrapin is used to refer to a larger group of semiaquatic turtles than the restricted meaning in America.

Australian usage differs from both American and British usage. Land tortoises are not native to Australia, and traditionally freshwater turtles have been called "tortoises" in Australia. Some Australian experts disapprove of this usage—believing that the term tortoises is "better confined to purely terrestrial animals with very different habits and needs, none of which are found in this country"—and promote the use of the term "freshwater turtle" to describe Australia's primarily aquatic members of the order Testudines because it avoids misleading use of the word "tortoise" and is a useful distinction from marine turtles.

== Biology ==
=== Life cycle ===
Most species lay small clutch sizes, seldom exceeding 20 eggs, and many species have clutch sizes of only 1–2 eggs. Incubation is characteristically long in most species, the average incubation period are between 100 and 160 days. Egg-laying typically occurs at night, after which the mother tortoise covers her clutch with sand, soil, and organic material. The eggs are left unattended, and depending on the species, take from 60 to 120 days to incubate. The size of the egg depends on the size of the mother and can be estimated by examining the width of the cloacal opening between the carapace and plastron. The plastron of a female tortoise often has a noticeable V-shaped notch below the tail which facilitates passing the eggs. Upon completion of the incubation period, a fully formed hatchling uses an egg tooth to break out of its shell. It digs to the surface of the nest and begins a life of survival on its own. They are hatched with an embryonic egg sac which serves as a source of nutrition for the first three to seven days until they have the strength and mobility to find food. Juvenile tortoises often require a different balance of nutrients than adults, so they may eat foods which a more mature tortoise would not. For example, the young of a strictly herbivorous species commonly will consume worms or insect larvae for additional protein.

Pair of African spurred tortoises mating

Video of tortoises mating

Tortoise laying eggs

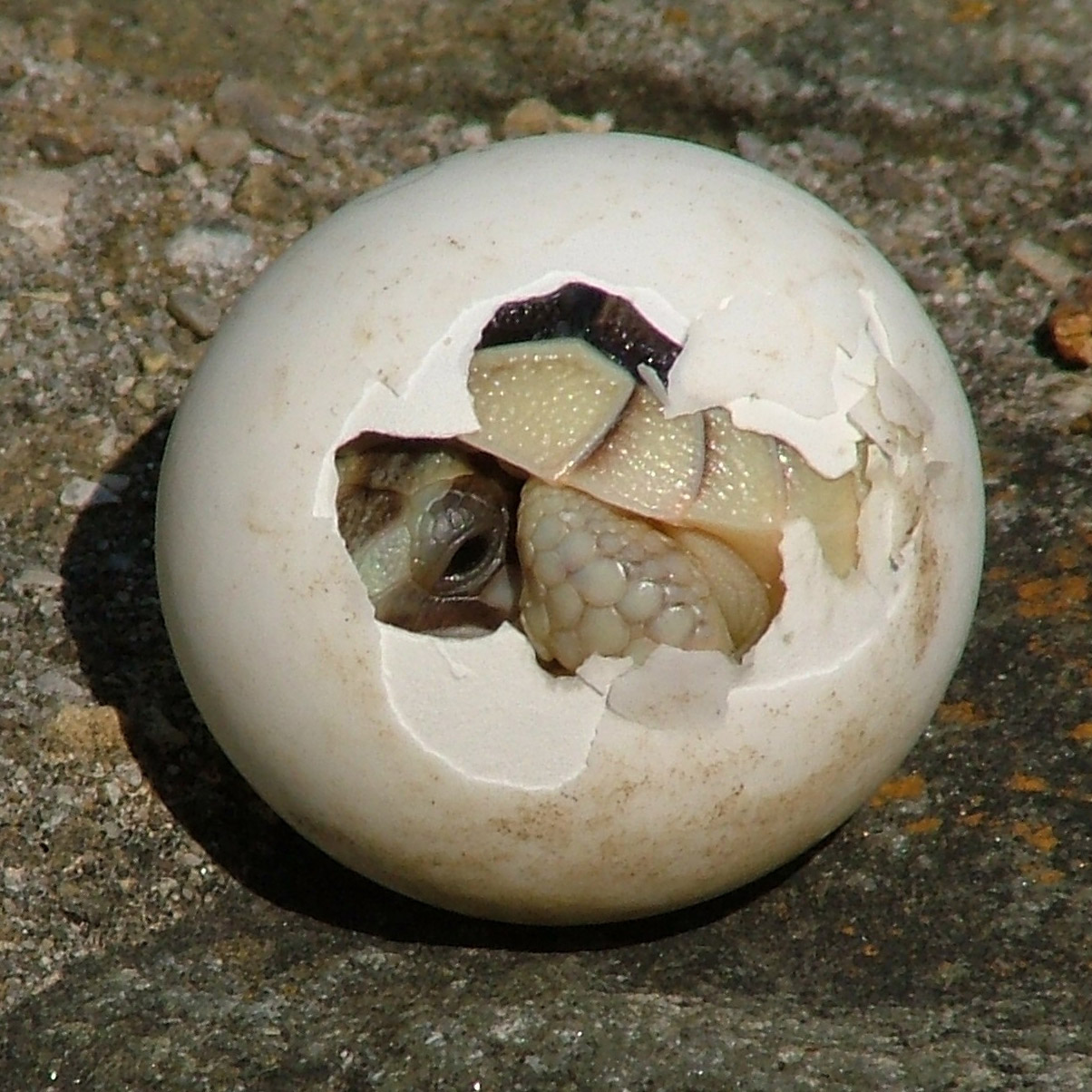
Baby marginated tortoise emerges from its egg

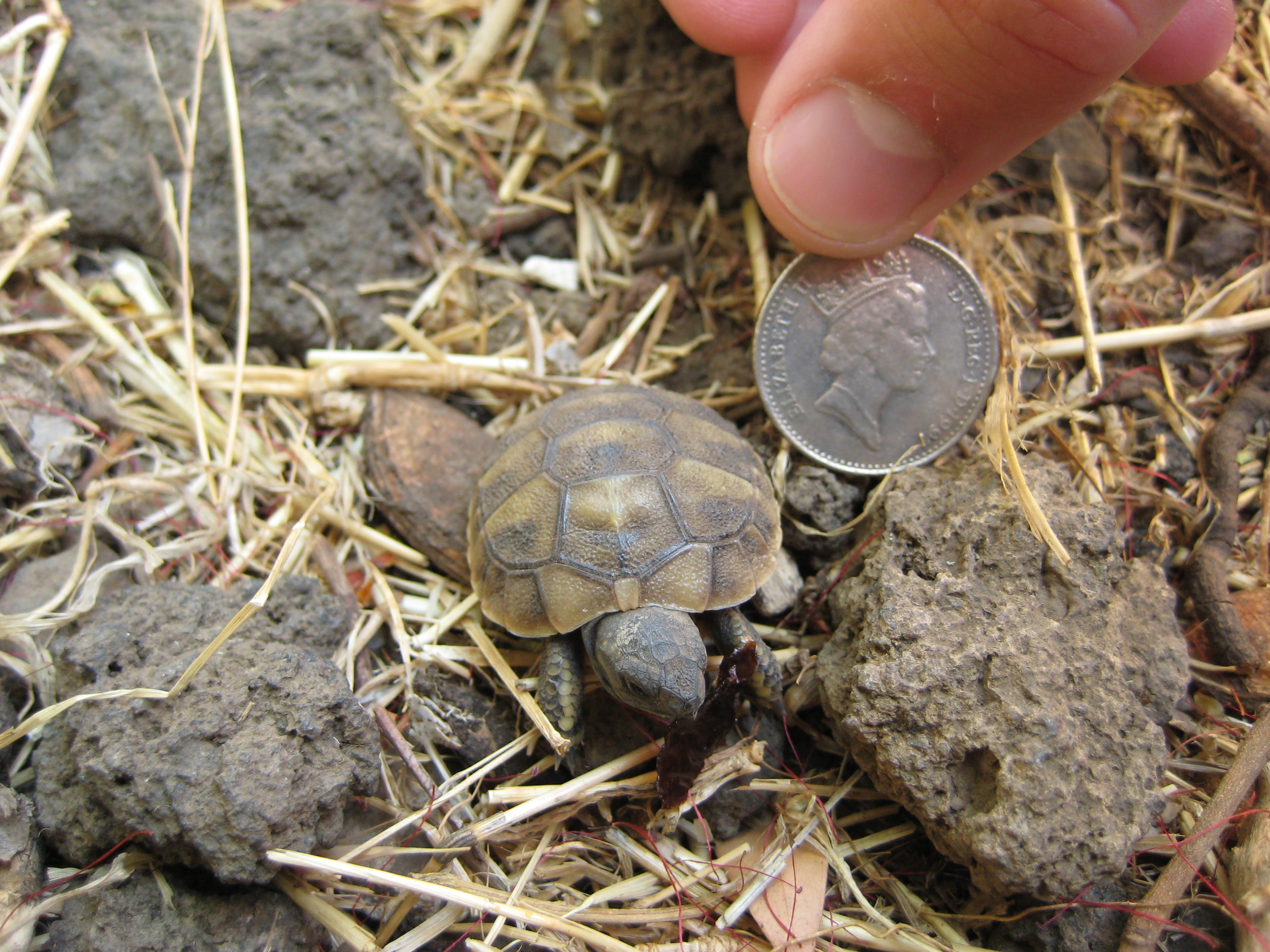
Baby tortoise, less than a day old

=== Longevity ===
The number of concentric rings on the carapace, much like the cross-section of a tree, can sometimes give a clue to how old the animal is, but, since the growth depends highly on the accessibility of food and water, a tortoise that has access to plenty of forage (or is regularly fed by its owner) with no seasonal variation will have no noticeable rings. Moreover, some tortoises grow more than one ring per season, and in some others, due to wear, some rings are no longer visible.

Tortoises have among the longest lifespans of any animal, and some individuals in captivity are known to have lived longer than 150 years. Because of this, they symbolize longevity in some cultures, such as Chinese culture. The oldest tortoise ever recorded, and one of the oldest individual animals ever recorded, was Tu'i Malila, which was presented to the Tongan royal family by the British explorer James Cook shortly after its birth in 1777. Tu'i Malila remained in the care of the Tongan royal family until its death by natural causes on May 19, 1965, at the age of 188.

The Alipore Zoo in India was the home to Adwaita, which zoo officials claimed was the oldest living animal until its death on March 23, 2006. Adwaita (also spelled Addwaita) was an Aldabra giant tortoise brought to India by Lord Wellesley, who handed it over to the Alipur Zoological Gardens in 1875 when the zoo was set up. West Bengal officials said records showed Adwaita was at least 150 years old, but other evidence pointed to 250. Adwaita was said to be the pet of Robert Clive.

Harriet was a resident at the Australia Zoo in Queensland from 1987 to her death in 2006; she was believed to have been brought to England by Charles Darwin aboard HMS Beagle and then on to Australia by John Clements Wickham. Harriet died on June 23, 2006, just shy of her 176th birthday.

Timothy, a female spur-thighed tortoise, lived to be about 165 years old. For 38 years, she was carried as a mascot aboard various ships in Britain's Royal Navy. Then in 1892, at age 53, she retired to the grounds of Powderham Castle in Devon. Up to the time of her death in 2004, she was believed to be the United Kingdom's oldest resident.

Jonathan, a Seychelles giant tortoise living on the island of St Helena, may be as old as 194 years.

DNA analysis of the genomes of the long-lived tortoises, Lonesome George, the iconic last member of Chelonoidis abingdonii, and the Aldabra giant tortoise Aldabrachelys gigantea led to the detection of lineage-specific variants affecting DNA repair genes that might contribute to their long lifespan.

=== Dimorphism ===
Many species of tortoises are sexually dimorphic, though the differences between males and females vary from species to species. In some species, males have a longer, more protruding neck plate than their female counterparts, while in others, the claws are longer on the females. The male plastron is curved inwards to aid reproduction. The easiest way to determine the sex of a tortoise is to look at the tail. The females, as a general rule, have smaller tails, dropped down, whereas the males have much longer tails which are usually pulled up and to the side of the rear shell.

=== Diet ===
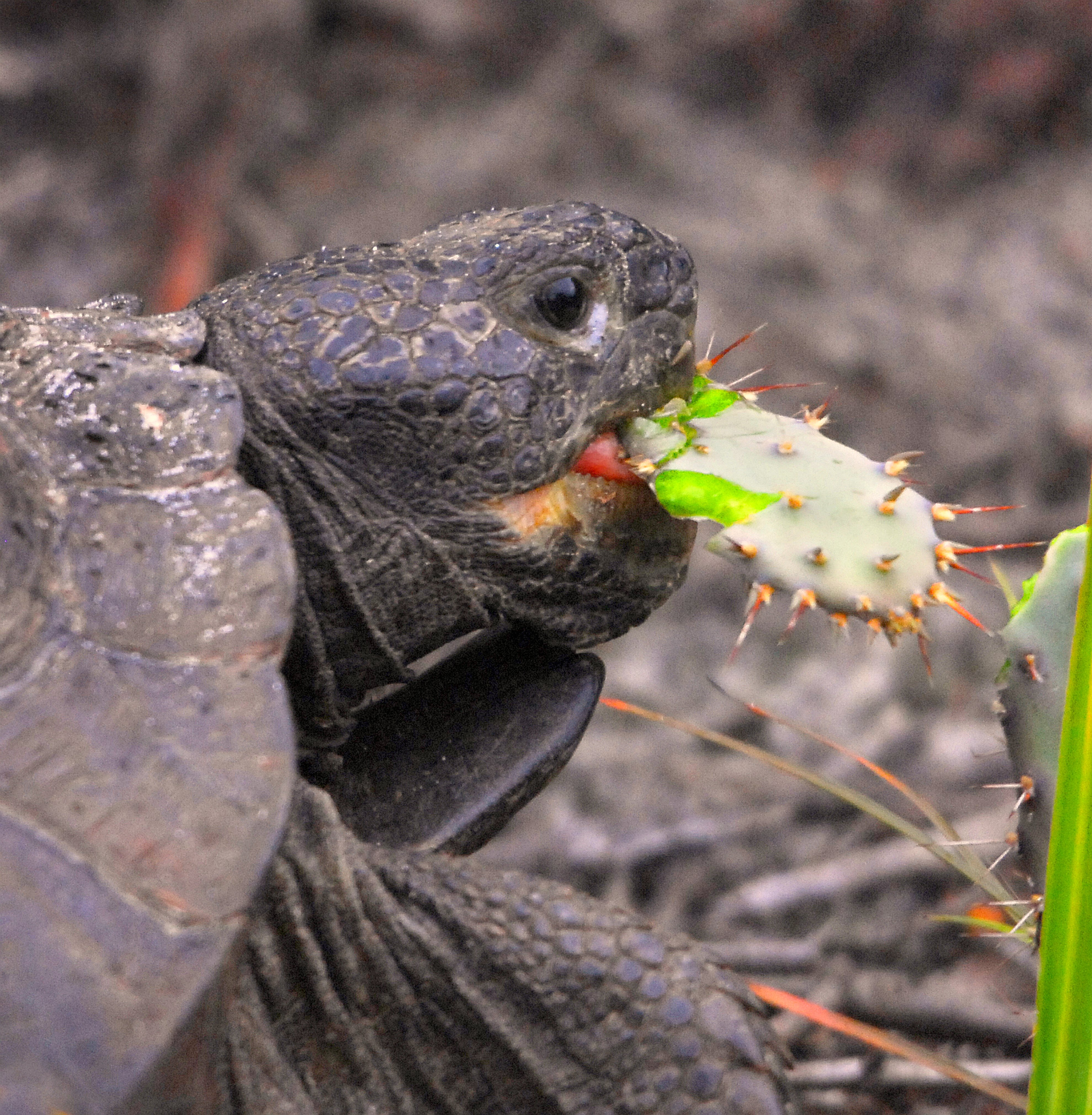
Gopher tortoise feeding on cactus

Tortoises are generally considered to be strict herbivores, feeding on grasses, weeds, leafy greens, flowers, and some fruits. However, hunting and eating of birds has been observed on occasion.

=== Behavior ===
Communication in tortoises is different from that of many other reptiles. Because they are restricted by their shell and short limbs, visual communication is not a strong form of communication in tortoises. Tortoises use olfactory cues to determine the sex of other tortoises so that they can find a potential mate. Tactile communication is important in tortoises during combat and courtship. In both combat and courtship, tortoises use ramming to communicate with other individuals.

=== Brain ===
The brain of a tortoise is extremely small. Red-footed tortoises, from Central and South America, do not have an area in the brain called the hippocampus, which relates to emotion, learning, memory and spatial navigation. Studies have shown that red-footed tortoises may rely on an area of the brain called the medial cortex for emotional actions, an area that humans use for actions such as decision making.

== Distribution ==
Tortoises are found from southern North America to southern South America, around the Mediterranean basin, across Eurasia to Southeast Asia, in sub-Saharan Africa, Madagascar, and some Pacific islands. They are absent from Australasia. They live in diverse habitats, including deserts, arid grasslands, and scrub to wet evergreen forests, and from sea level to mountains. Most species, however, occupy semiarid habitats.

Many large islands are or were characterized by species of giant tortoises. Part of the reason for this is that tortoises are good at oceanic dispersal. Despite being unable to swim, tortoises are able to survive long periods adrift at sea because they can survive months without food or fresh water. Tortoises have been known to survive oceanic dispersals of more than 740 km. Once on islands tortoises faced few predators or competitors and could grow to large sizes and become the dominant large herbivores on many islands due to their low metabolic rate and reduced need for fresh water compared to mammals.

There are only two living species of giant tortoises, the Aldabra giant tortoise on Aldabra Atoll and the dozen subspecies of Galapagos giant tortoise found on the Galapagos Islands. However, until recently giant tortoises could be found on nearly every major island group, including the Bahamas, the Greater Antilles (including Cuba and Hispaniola), the Lesser Antilles, the Canary Islands, Malta, the Seychelles, the Mascarene Islands (including Mauritius and Reunion), and Madagascar. Most of these tortoises were wiped out by human arrival. Many of these giant tortoises are not closely related (belonging to different genera such as Megalochelys, Chelonoidis, Centrochelys, Aldabrachelys, Cylindraspis, and Hesperotestudo), but are thought to have independently evolved large body size through convergent evolution. Giant tortoises are notably absent from Australasia and many south Pacific islands, but the distantly related meiolaniid stem turtles are thought to have filled the same niche. Giant tortoises are also known from the Oligocene-Pliocene of mainland North America, South America, Europe, Asia, and Africa, but are all now extinct, which is also attributed to human activity.

== Evolution ==
=== Fossil history ===
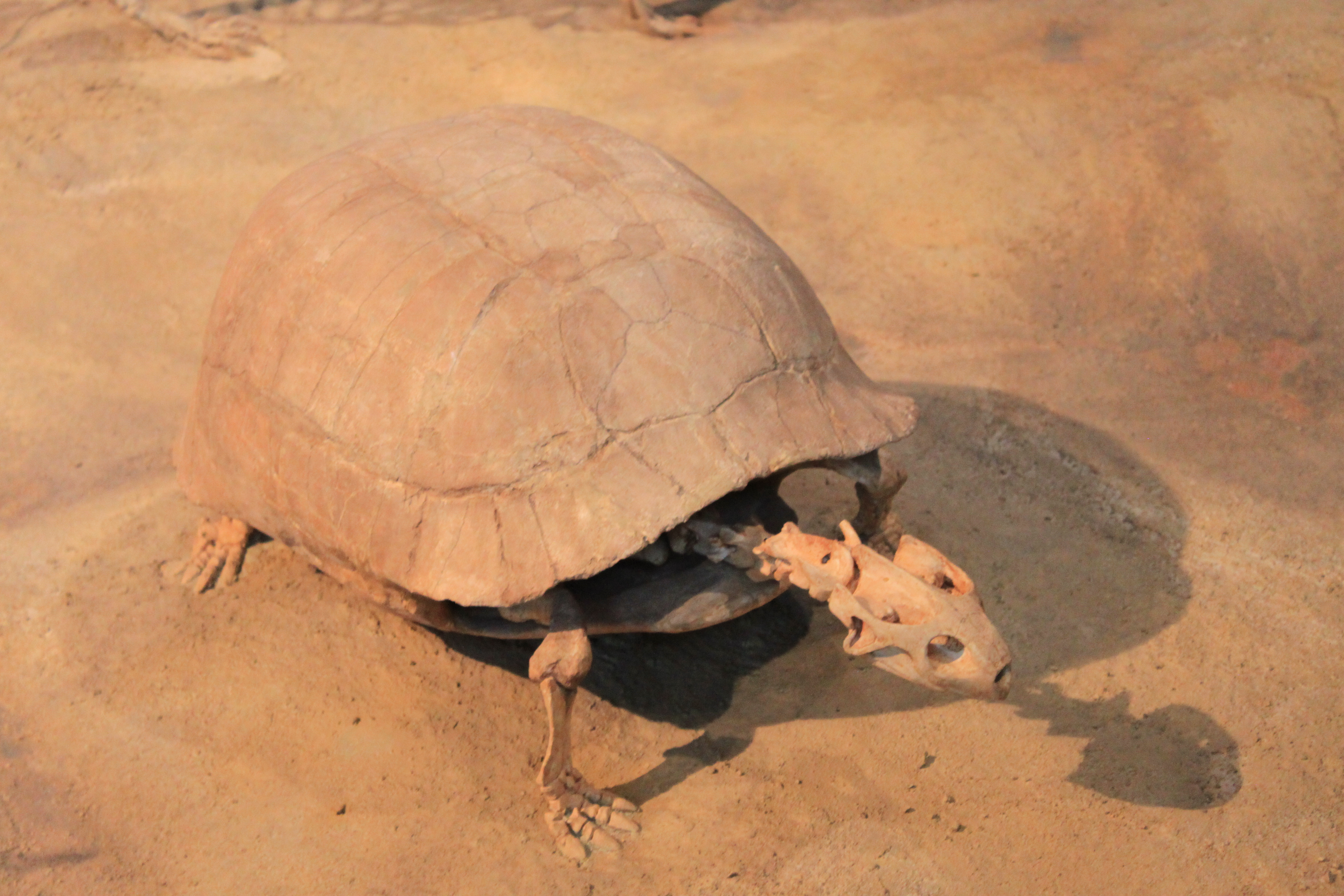
Fossil skeleton of Stylemys from the Paleogene

Tortoises may have evolved from Triassic half-shelled aquatic turtles with a full set of teeth like Odontochelys, or from fully-shelled aquatic turtles with few teeth like Proganochelys. Long after those early turtles, terrestrial tortoises first appear in the fossil record in the Paleogene, with genera such as Stylemys.

=== Phylogeny ===
A molecular phylogeny of tortoises, following Le et al. (2006: 525):

- Testudinidae
  - - Ergilemys
    - Manouria
    - Gopherus
  - - - Indotestudo
      - Testudo
      - Malacochersus
    - - - Centrochelys sulcata
        - Geochelone
          - Geochelone platynota
          - Geochelone elegans
      - - - - Chersina
            - Homopus
          - - Stigmochelys
            - Psammobates
        - - Aldabrachelys
          - Pyxis
          - Astrochelys radiata
          - Astrochelys yniphora
      - - Kinixys
        - Chelonoidis

A separate phylogeny via mtDNA analysis was found by Kehlmaier et al. (2021):

- Testudinidae
  - - Manouria
    - - Gopherus
      - - - Testudo
          - - Indotestudo
            - - Agrionemys
              - Malacochersus
        - - †Cylindraspis
          - - - - - - - Chersina
                      - Chersobius
                    - Homopus
                  - - Psammobates
                    - Stigmochelys
                - - - Aldabrachelys
                    - - Pyxis
                      - Astrochelys
                  - - Kinixys
                    - - - Centrochelys
                        - Geochelone
                      - Chelonoidis

In 2023 Kehlmaier again recovered a very similar phylogeny to the 2021 one, which further reaffirmed the evolutionary distinctiveness of the extinct Cylindraspis, but swapped the position of Gopherus and Manouria, making Gopherus the most basal genus.

=== Taxonomy ===
This species list largely follows Turtle Taxonomy Working Group (2021) and the Turtle Extinctions Working Group (2015).

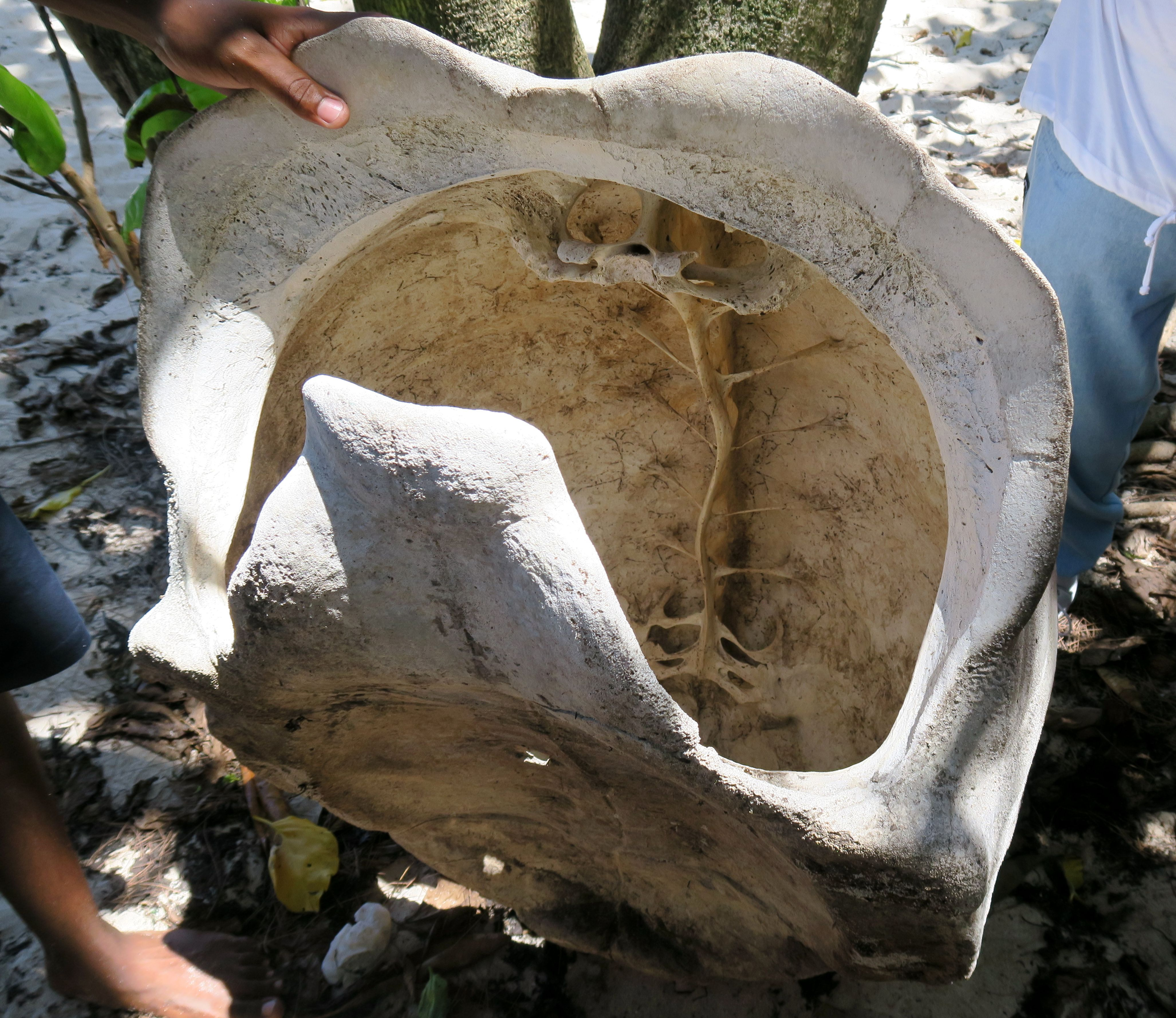
A skeleton of Aldabra giant tortoise found in Cousin Island (Seychelles).

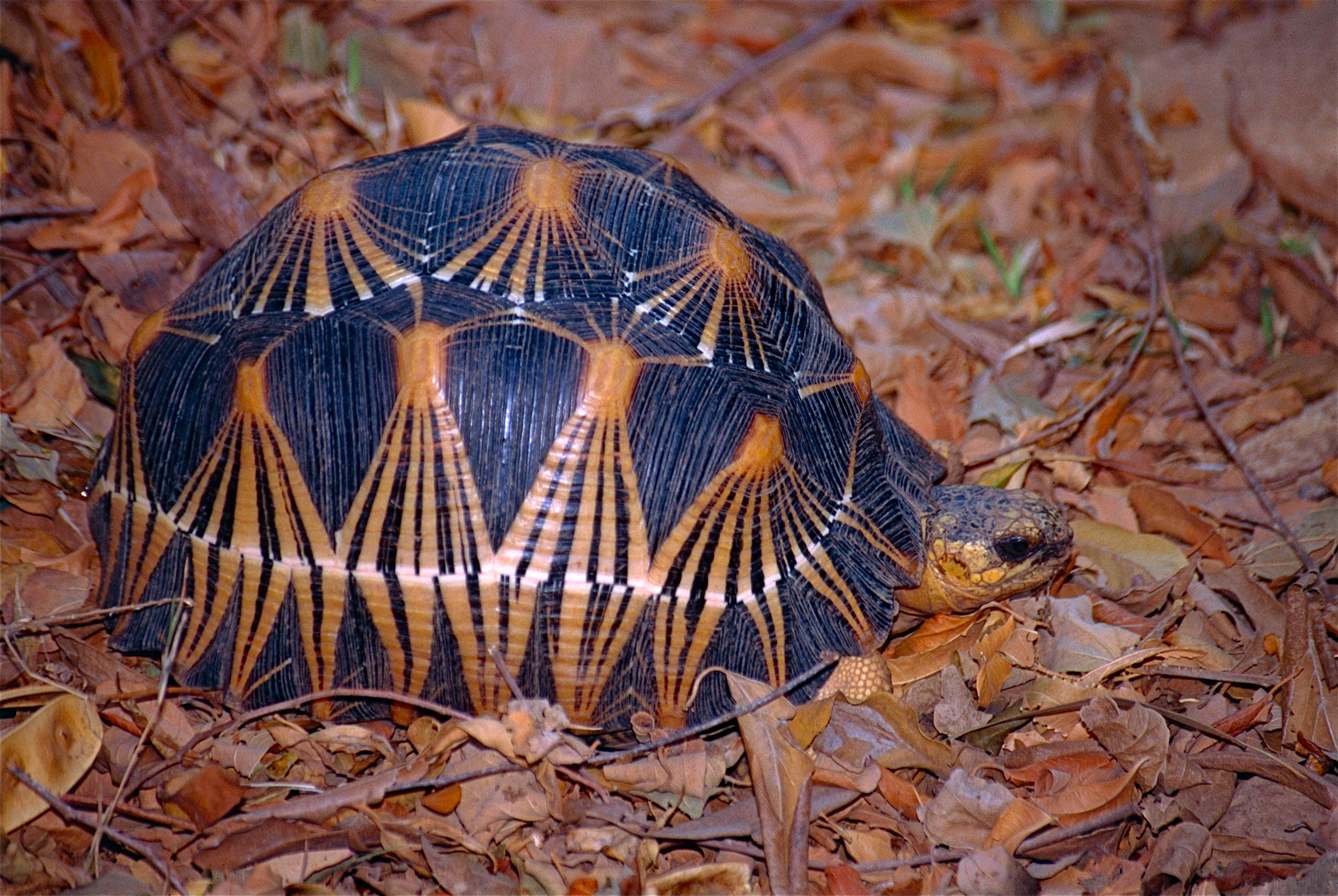
Radiated tortoise (Astrochelys radiata)

Family Testudinidae Batsch 1788

- †Alatochelon
  - † Alatochelon myrteum
- Aldabrachelys Loveridge and Williams 1957:166
  - Aldabrachelys gigantea Aldabra giant tortoise.
    - A. g. gigantea Aldabra tortoise.
    - A. g. arnoldi Arnold's giant tortoise.
    - A. g. daudinii Daudin's giant tortoise.
    - A. g. hololissa Domed Seychelles giant tortoise.
  - †Aldabrachelys abrupta Late Holocene, extinct circa 1200 AD
  - †Aldabrachelys grandidieri Late Holocene, extinct circa 884 AD
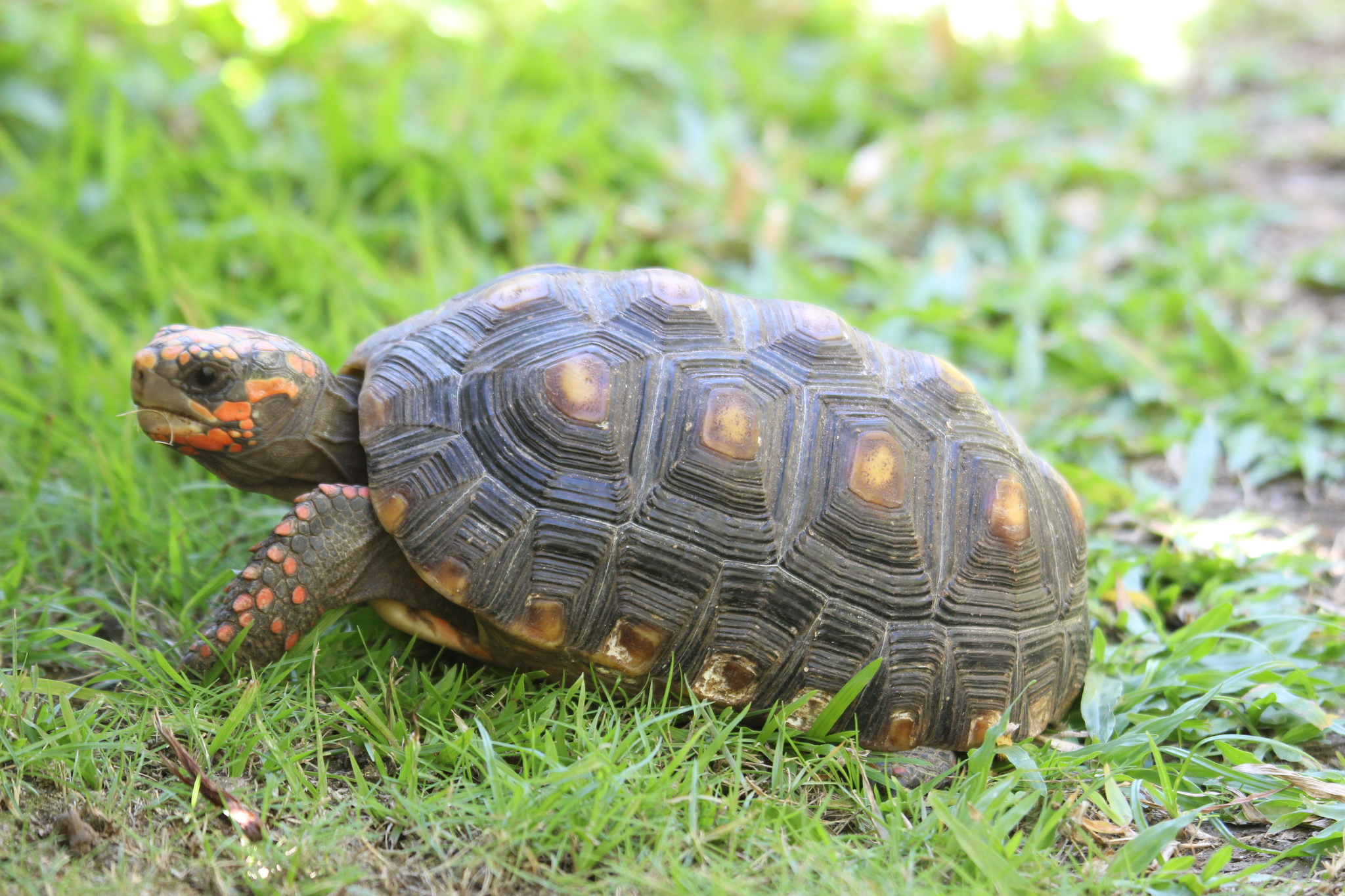
- Red-footed tortoise (Chelonoidis carbonarius)
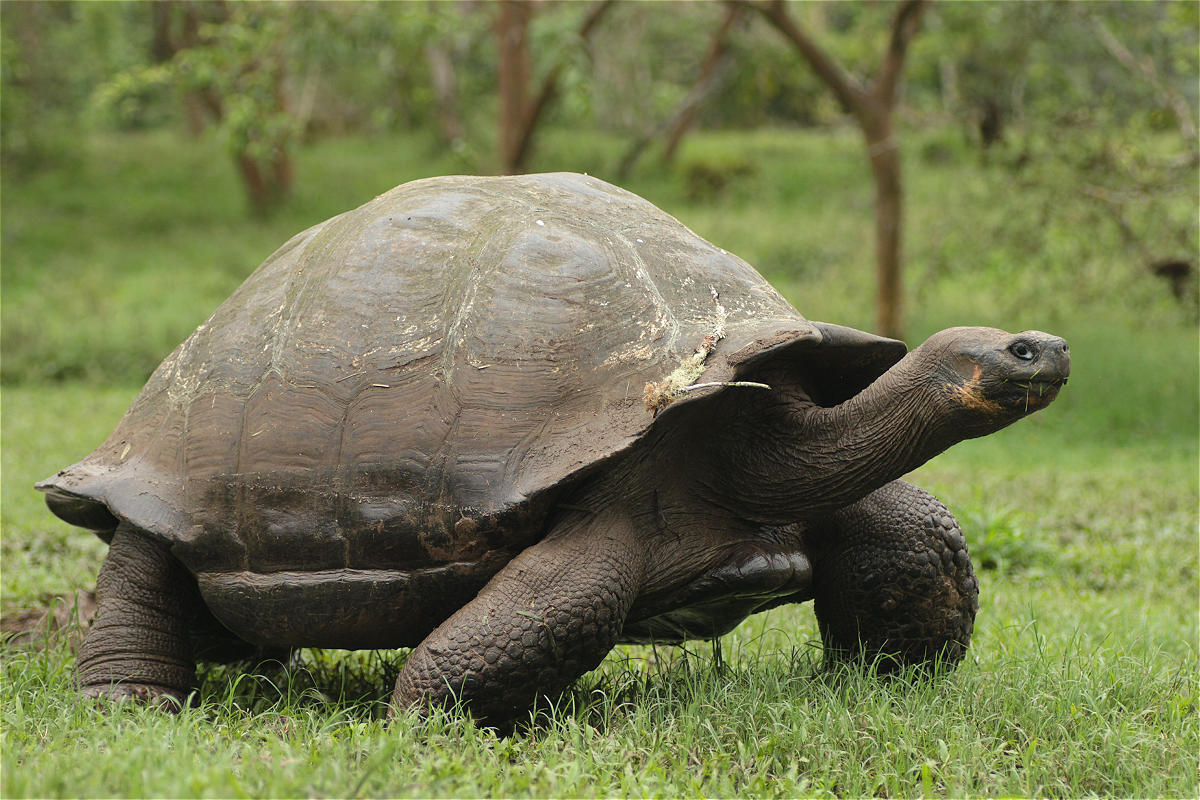
  Galápagos giant tortoise (Chelonoidis niger)
  Astrochelys Gray, 1873:4
  - Astrochelys radiata, radiated tortoise
  - Astrochelys yniphora, angonoka tortoise, (Madagascan) plowshare tortoise
- Centrochelys Gray 1872:5
  - † Centrochelys atlantica
  - † Centrochelys burchardi Tenerife giant tortoise
  - † Centrochelys marocana
  - † Centrochelys robusta Maltese giant tortoise
  - Centrochelys sulcata, African spurred tortoise, sulcata tortoise
  - † Centrochelys vulcanica Gran Canaria giant tortoise
- Chelonoidis Fitzinger 1835:112
  - † Chelonoidis alburyorum Abaco tortoise, Late Pleistocene, extinct c. 1400 CE
  - Chelonoidis carbonarius, red-footed tortoise
  - Chelonoidis chilensis, Chaco tortoise, Argentine tortoise or southern wood tortoise
  - † Chelonoidis cubensis Cuban giant tortoise
  - Chelonoidis denticulatus Brazilian giant tortoise, yellow-footed tortoise
  - † C. dominicensis Dominican giant tortoise
  - † Chelonoidis lutzae Lutz's giant tortoise, Late Pleistocene
  - † Chelonoidis monensis Mona tortoise
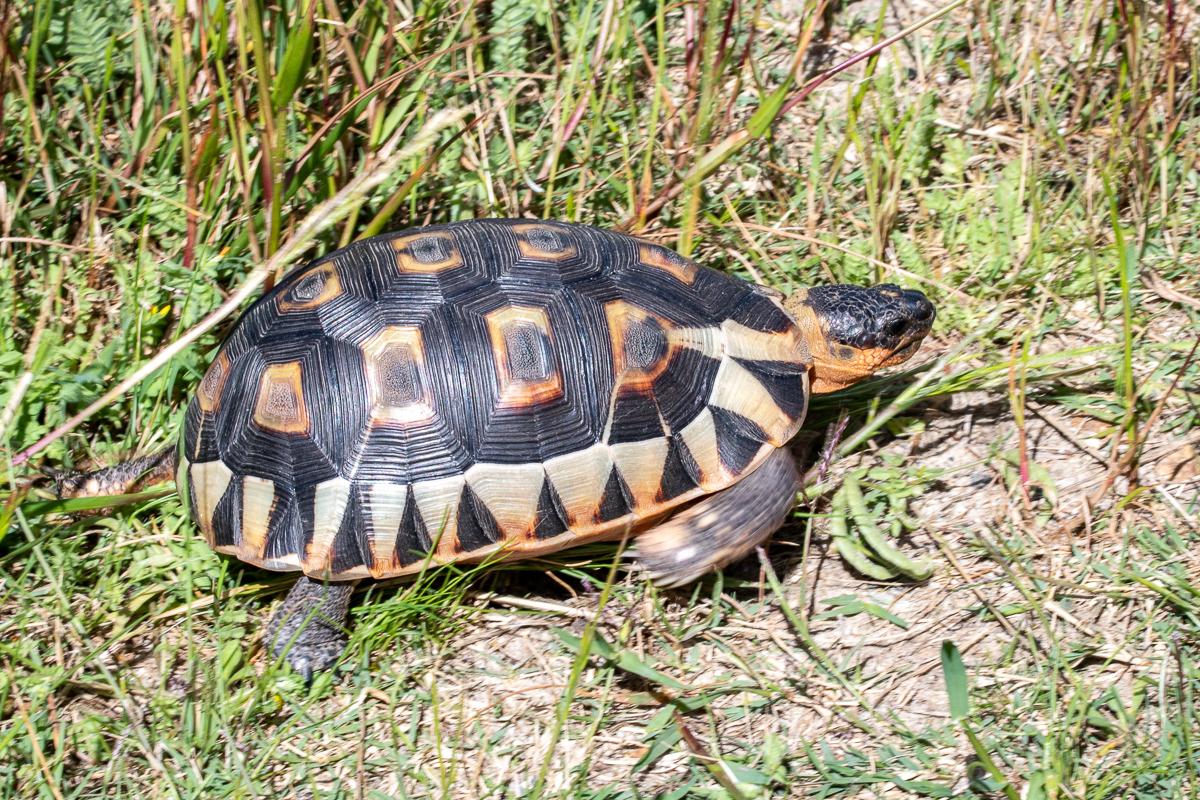
  - Angulate tortoise (Chersina angulata)
    Chelonoidis niger Galapagos giant tortoise
  - † Chelonoidis sellovii Southern Cone giant tortoise, Pleistocene
  - † Chelonoidis sombrerensis Sombrero giant tortoise, Late Pleistocene
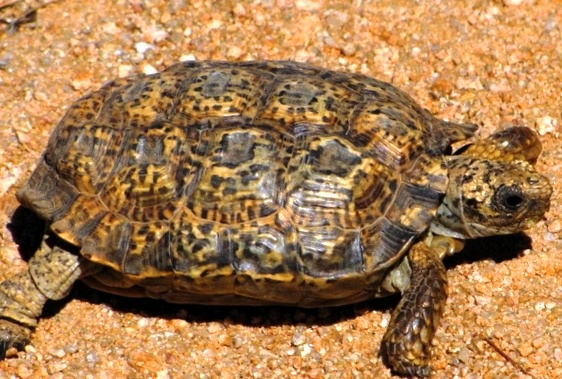
- Speckled padloper (Chersobius signatus)
  Chersina Gray 1830:5
  - Chersina angulata, angulated tortoise, South African bowsprit tortoise
  - Chersina langebaanwegi
- † Cheirogaster Bergounioux 1935:78
  - †Cheirogaster gymnesica Late Pliocene to Early Pleistocene
  - †Cheirogaster schafferi Pliocene to Early Pleistocene
- Chersobius Fitzinger, 1835
  - Chersobius boulengeri, Karoo padloper, Karoo dwarf tortoise, Boulenger's Cape tortoise
  - Chersobius signatus, speckled padloper tortoise
  - Chersobius solus, Nama padloper, Berger's Cape tortoise
- †Cymatholcus
  - † Cymatholcus schucherti (syn. Hadrianus schucherti)
- †Cylindraspis Fitzinger 1835:112 (all species extinct) following Austin and Arnold, 2001:
  - †Cylindraspis indica, synonym Cylindraspis borbonica, Reunion giant tortoise
  - †Cylindraspis inepta, saddle-backed Mauritius giant tortoise or Mauritius giant domed tortoise
  - †Cylindraspis peltastes, domed Rodrigues giant tortoise
  - †Cylindraspis triserrata, domed Mauritius giant tortoise or Mauritius giant flat-shelled tortoise
  - †Cylindraspis vosmaeri, saddle-backed Rodrigues giant tortoise
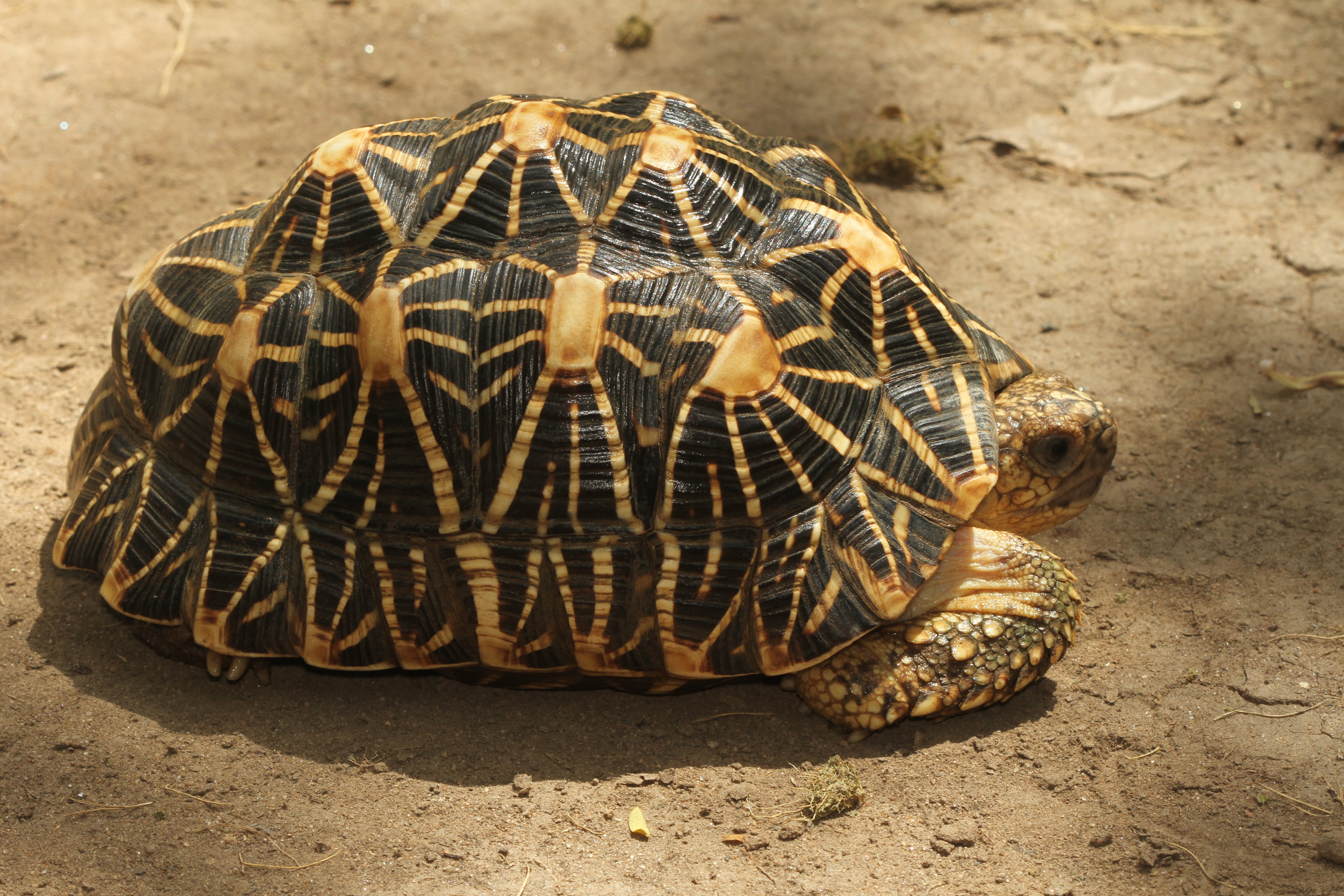
- Indian star tortoise (Geochelone elegans)
  † Ergilemys Ckhikvadze, 1984
  - Ergilemys bruneti
  - Ergilemys insolitus
  - Ergilemys saikanensis
- †Floridemys O.P Hay, 1916
  - †Floridemys nana
  - †Floridemys nanus
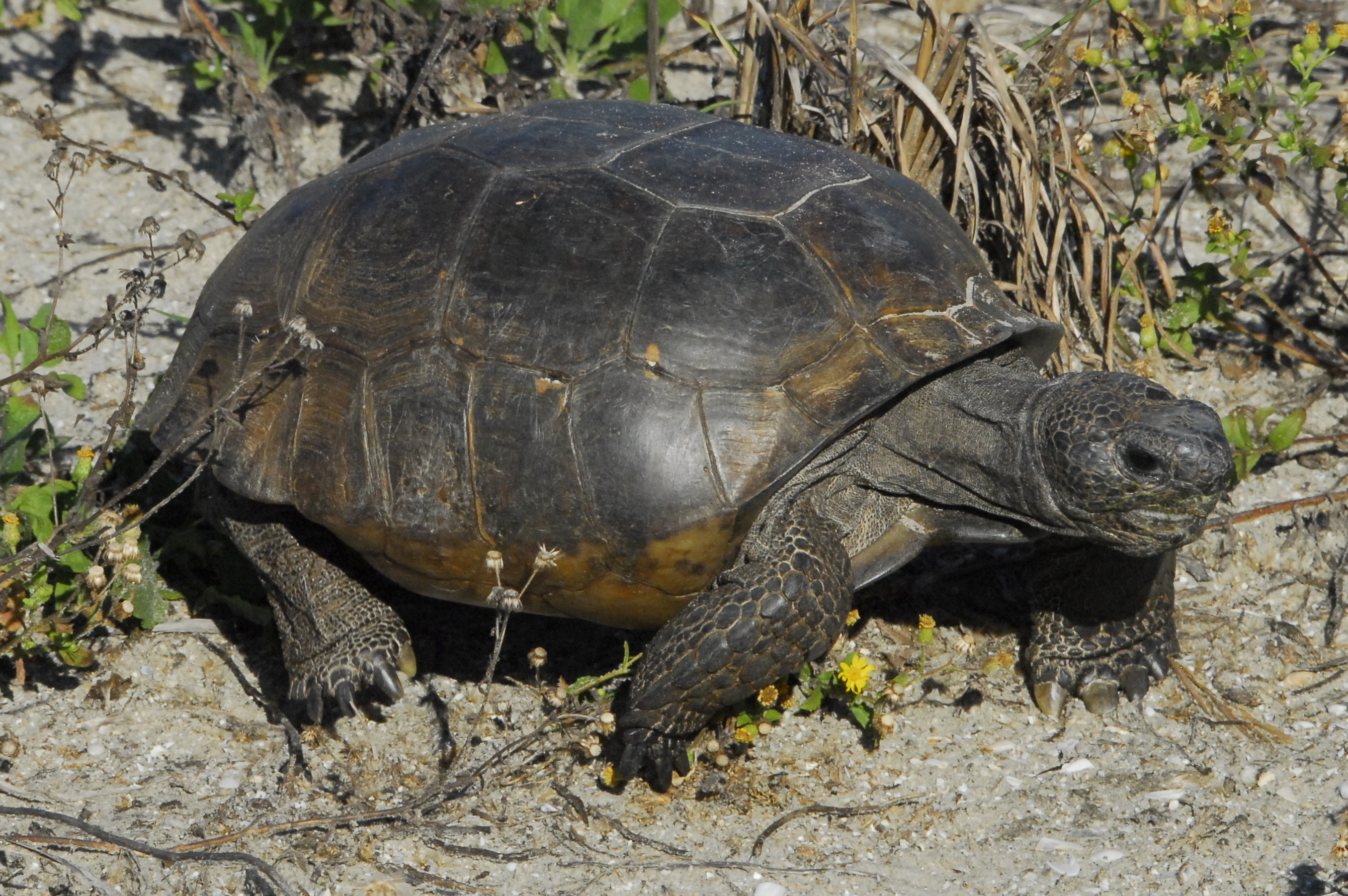
- Gopher tortoise (Gopherus polyphemus)
  Geochelone Fitzinger 1835:112
  - Geochelone elegans, Indian star tortoise
  - Geochelone platynota, Burmese star tortoise
- Gopherus Rafinesque 1832:64
  - Gopherus agassizii, Mojave desert tortoise, Agassiz's desert tortoise
  - Gopherus berlandieri, Texas tortoise, Berlandier's tortoise
  - Gopherus flavomarginatus, Bolson tortoise
  - Gopherus morafkai, Sonoran desert tortoise, Morafka's desert tortoise
  - Gopherus polyphemus, gopher tortoise
  - Gopherus evgoodei, Sinaloan desert tortoise, Goode's thornscrub tortoise
- † Hadrianus
  - Hadrianus corsoni (syn. H. octonarius)
  - Hadrianus robustus
  - Hadrianus utahensis
- † Hesperotestudo
  - Hesperotestudo alleni
  - Hesperotestudo angusticeps
  - Hesperotestudo brontops
  - Hesperotestudo equicomes
  - Hesperotestudo impensa
  - Hesperotestudo incisa
  - Hesperotestudo johnstoni
  - Hesperotestudo kalganensis
  - Hesperotestudo niobrarensis
  - Hesperotestudo orthopygia
  - Hesperotestudo osborniana
  - Hesperotestudo percrassa
  - Hesperotestudo riggsi
  - Hesperotestudo tumidus
  - Hesperotestudo turgida
  - Hesperotestudo wilsoni
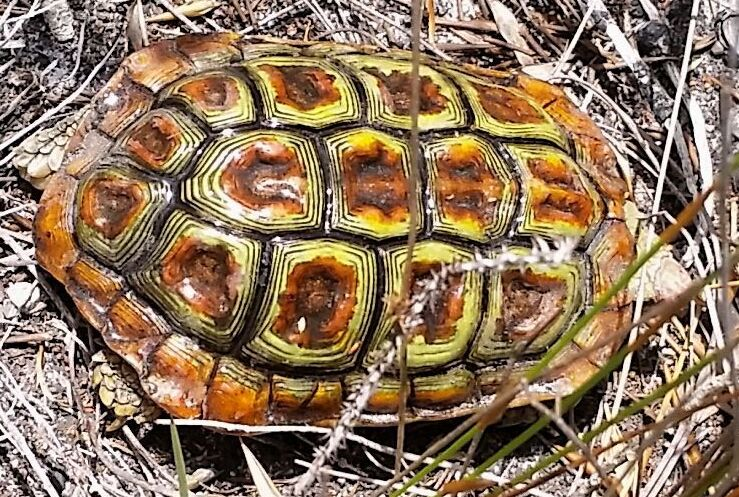
- Parrot-beaked padloper (Homopus areolatus)
  Homopus Duméril and Bibron 1834:357
  - Homopus areolatus, common padloper, parrot-beaked tortoise, beaked Cape tortoise
  - Homopus femoralis, greater padloper, greater dwarf tortoise
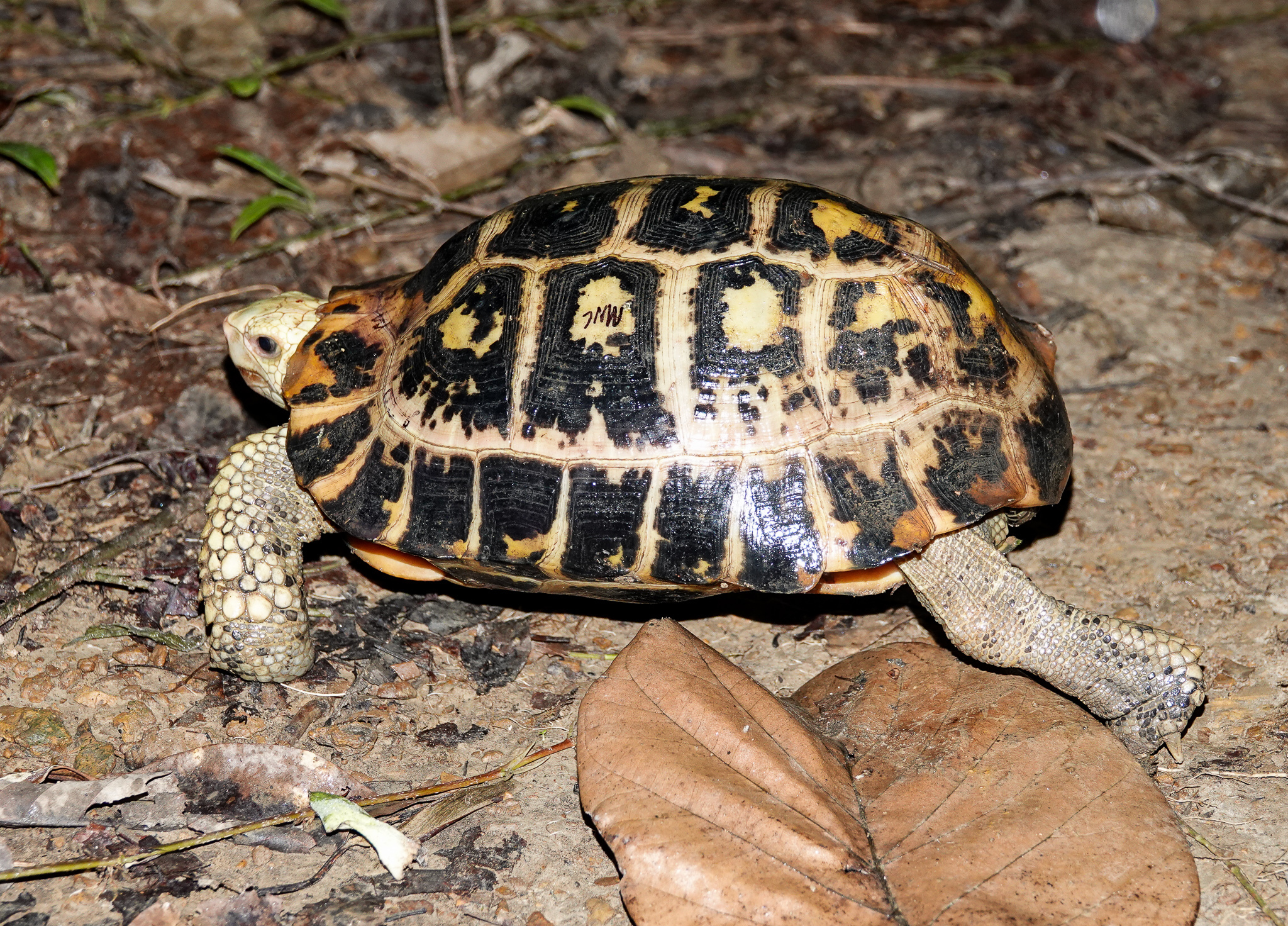
- Elongated tortoise (Indotestudo elongata)
  Indotestudo Lindholm, 1929
  - Indotestudo elongata, elongated tortoise, yellow-headed tortoise
  - Indotestudo forstenii, Forsten's tortoise, East Indian tortoise
  - Indotestudo travancorica, Travancore tortoise
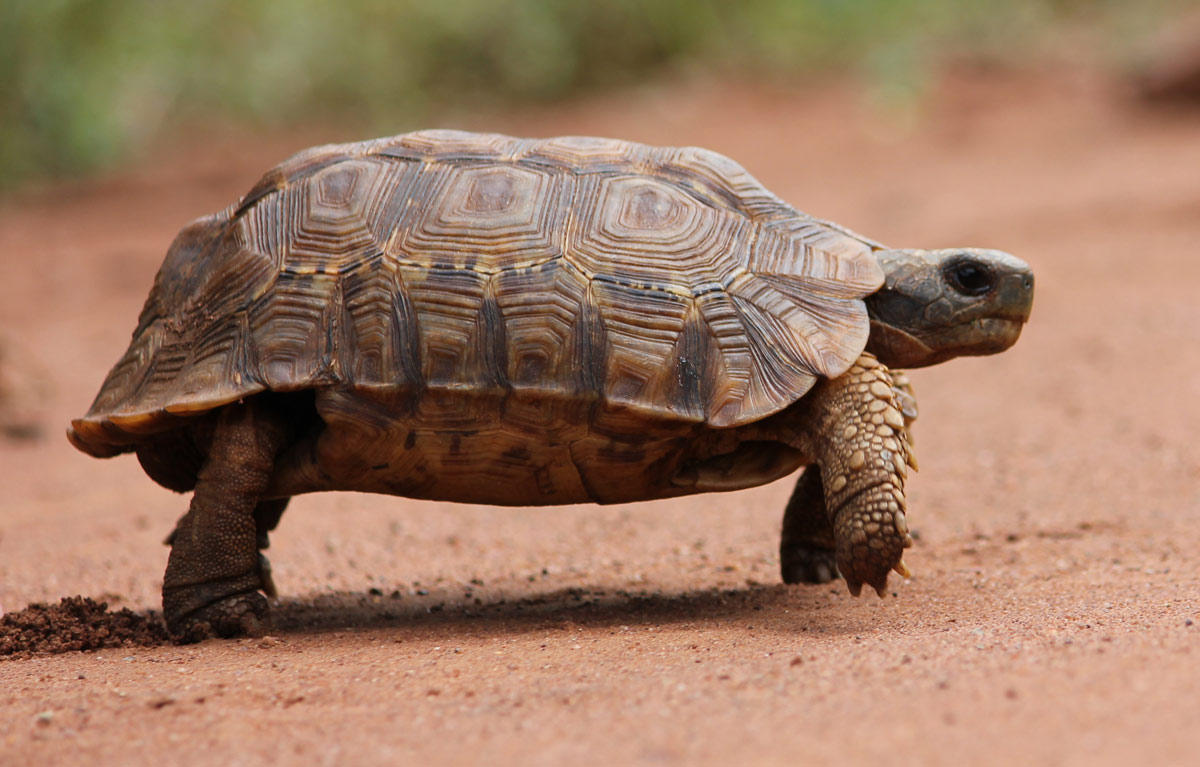
- Lobatse hinge-back tortoise (Kinixys lobatsiana)
  Kinixys
  - Kinixys belliana, Bell's hinge-back tortoise
  - Kinixys erosa, forest hinge-back tortoise, serrated hinge-back tortoise
  - Kinixys homeana, Home's hinge-back tortoise
  - Kinixys lobatsiana, Lobatse hinge-back tortoise
  - Kinixys natalensis, Natal hinge-back tortoise
  - Kinixys spekii, Speke's hinge-back tortoise
- Malacochersus Lindholm 1929:285
  - Malacochersus tornieri, pancake tortoise
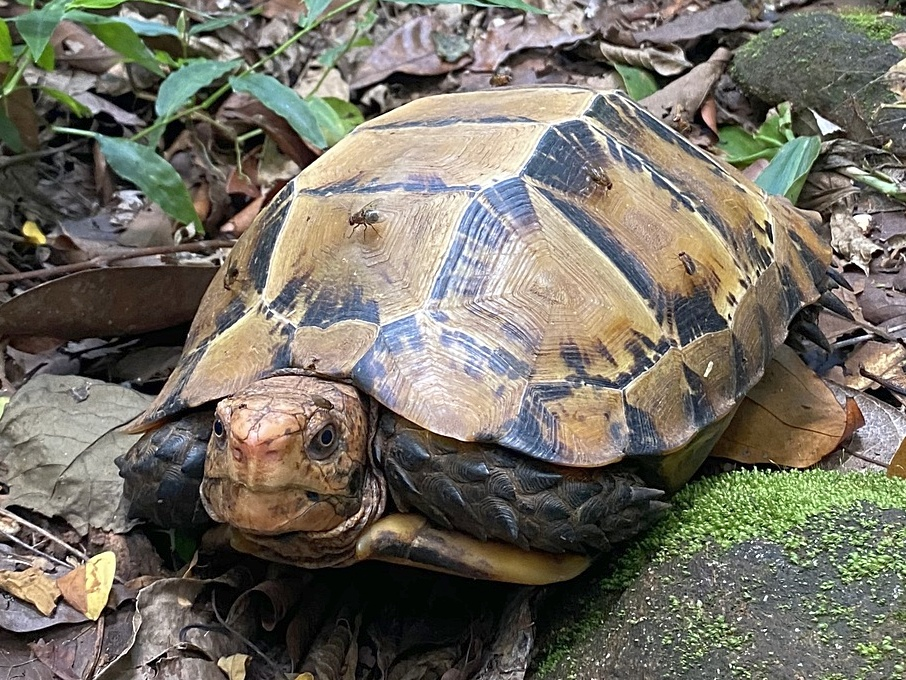
- Impressed tortoise (Manouria impressa)
  Manouria Gray 1854:133
  - Manouria emys, Asian giant tortoise, brown tortoise (mountain tortoise)
  - Manouria impressa, impressed tortoise
- † Megalochelys Falconer, H. and Cautley, P.T. 1837.
  - † Megalochelys atlas, Atlas tortoise, Extinct – Pliocene to Pleistocene
  - † Megalochelys cautleyi, Cautley's giant tortoise
- †Oligopherus Hutchinson, 1996
  - †Oligopherus laticuneus
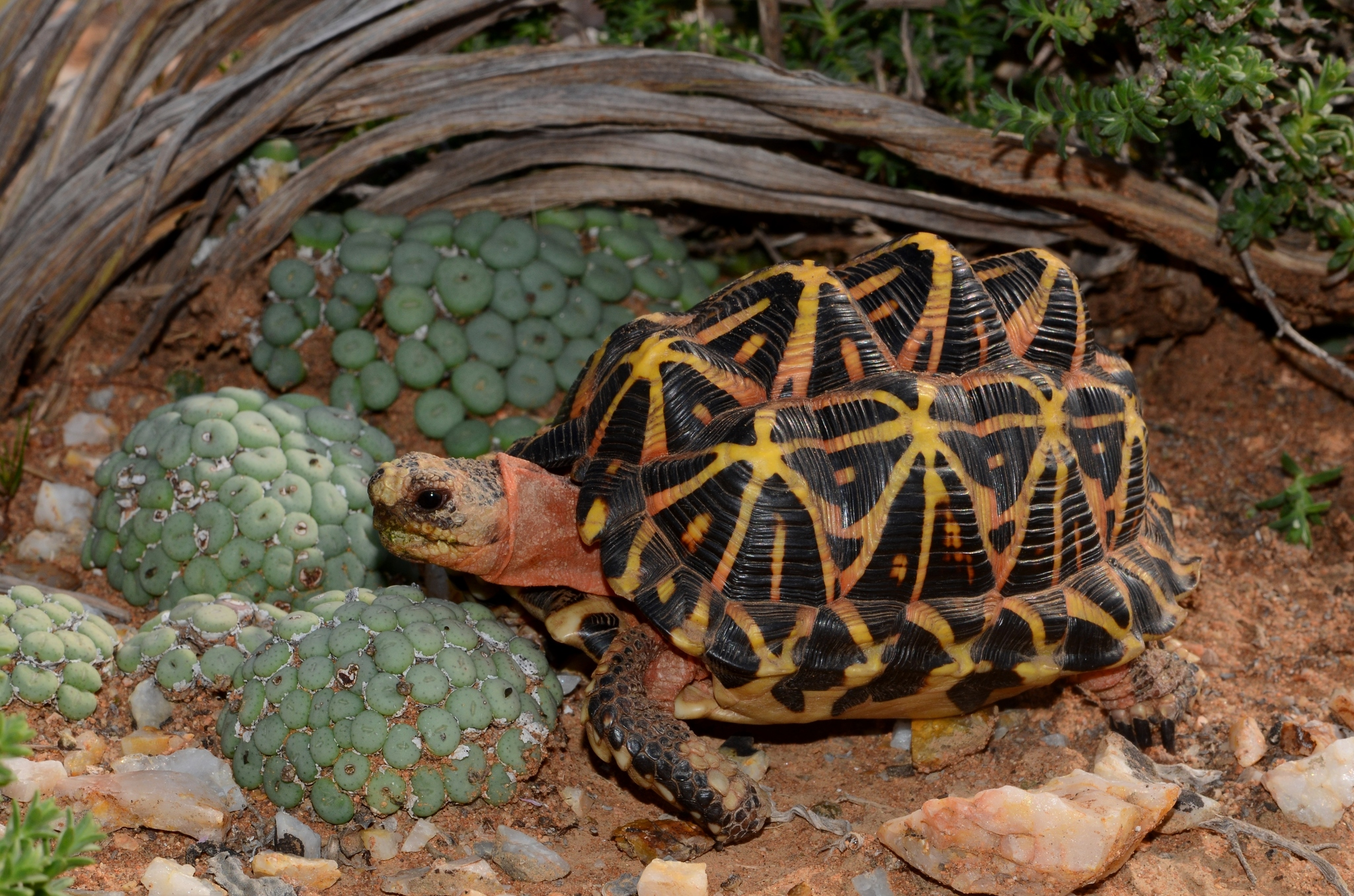
- Tent tortoise (Psammobates tentorius)
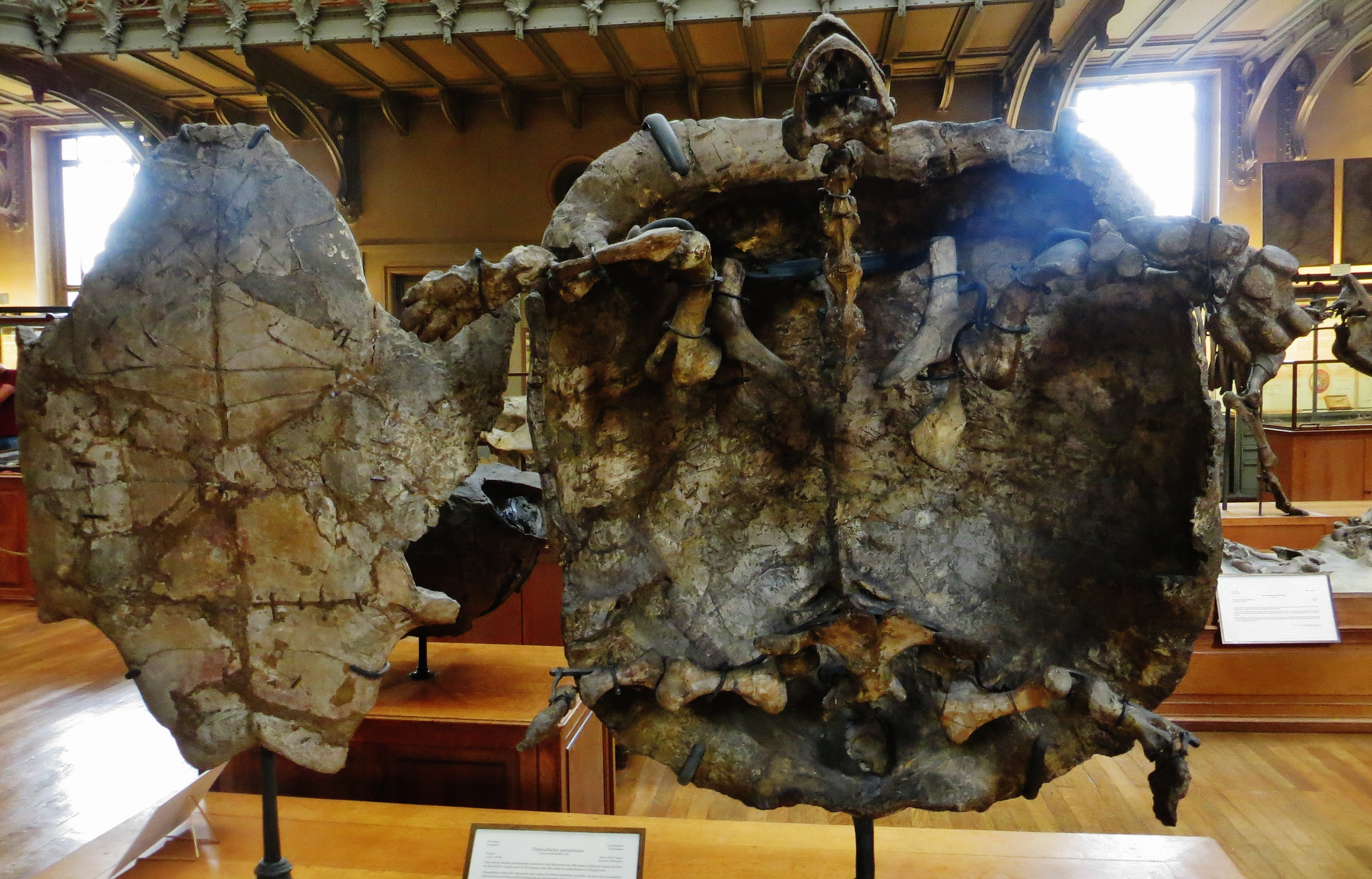
  †Titanochelon perpiniana
  Psammobates Fitzinger 1835:113
  - Psammobates geometricus, geometric tortoise
  - Psammobates oculifer, serrated tent tortoise, Kalahari tent tortoise
  - Psammobates tentorius, African tent tortoise
- Pyxis Bell 1827:395
  - Pyxis arachnoides, (Madagascan) spider tortoise
  - Pyxis planicauda, flat-backed spider tortoise, (Madagascan) flat-tailed tortoise, flat-tailed spider tortoise
- Stigmochelys Gray, 1873
  - Stigmochelys pardalis, leopard tortoise
- † Stylemys
  - Stylemys botti
  - Stylemys calaverensis
  - Stylemys canetotiana
  - Stylemys capax
  - Stylemys conspecta
  - Stylemys copei
  - Stylemys emiliae
  - Stylemys frizaciana
  - Stylemys karakolensis
  - Stylemys nebrascensis (syn. S. amphithorax)
  - Stylemys neglectus
  - Stylemys oregonensis
  - Stylemys pygmea
  - Stylemys uintensis
  - Stylemys undabuna
- † Titanochelon
  - †Titanochelon gymnesica (Bate, 1914) Balearic Islands, Pliocene
  - † Titanochelon bolivari (Hernandez-Pacheco, 1917) (type) Iberian Peninsula, Miocene
  - † Titanochelon bacharidisi (Vlachos et al., 2014) Greece, Bulgaria, Late Miocene
  - † Titanochelon perpiniana (Deperet 1885) France, Pliocene
  - †Titanochelon schafferi (Szalai, 1931) Samos, Greece, Miocene
  - †Titanochelon vitodurana (Biedermann 1862) Switzerland, Early Miocene
  - †Titanochelon kayadibiensis Karl, Staesche & Safi, 2021, Anatolia, Miocene
  - †Titanochelon eurysternum (Gervais, 1848–1852) France, Miocene
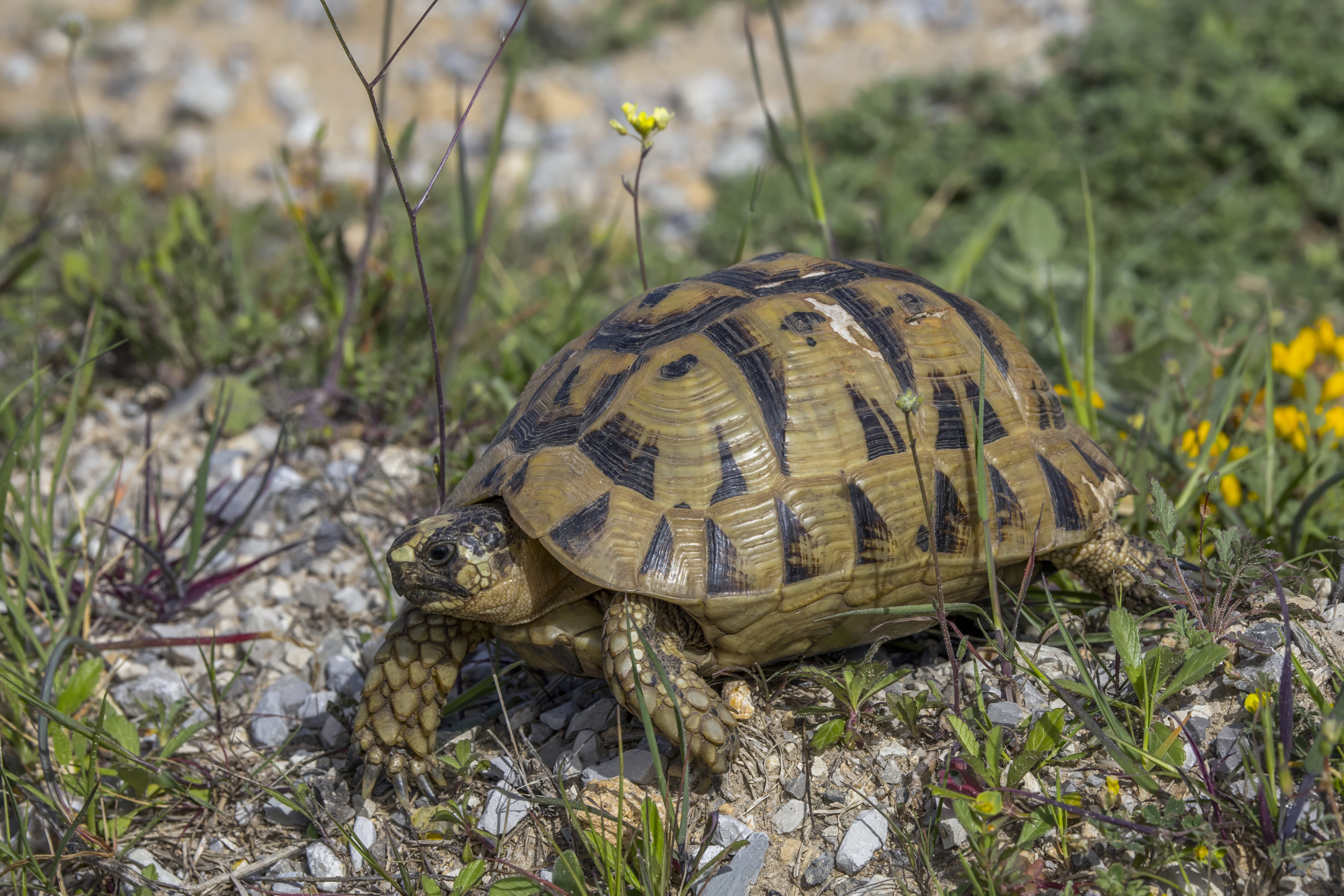
    Greek tortoise (Testudo graeca)
  - †Titanochelon ginsburgi (de Broin, 1977 ) France, Miocene
  - †Titanochelon leberonensis (Depéret, 1890) France, Miocene
- Testudo
  - Testudo graeca, Greek tortoise, spur-thighed tortoise, Moorish tortoise
  - Testudo hermanni, Hermann's tortoise
  - Testudo horsfieldii, Russian tortoise
  - Testudo kleinmanni, Egyptian tortoise, including Negev tortoise
  - Testudo marginata, marginated tortoise
  - †Testudo sahakyanae (Vlachos & Vasilyan, 2026 ) Armenia, Pliocene

== In human culture ==
In Hinduism, Kurma (Sanskrit: कुर्म) was the second Avatar of Vishnu. Like the Matsya Avatara, Kurma also belongs to the Satya Yuga. Vishnu took the form of a half-man, half-tortoise, the lower half being a tortoise. He is normally shown as having four arms. He sat on the bottom of the ocean after the Great Flood. A mountain was placed on his back by the other gods so they could churn the ocean of milk and find the ancient treasures of the Vedic peoples.

In Judaism, tortoises are seen as unclean animals. Early Christians also viewed tortoises as unclean.

In Chinese and Japanese folk religion, tortoises are considered oracular animals. Tortoise shells were used by ancient Chinese as oracle bones to make predictions.

In Ancient Greek mythology, Hermes crafts the first lyre from a tortoise.

In September, 1968, two Russian tortoises became the first animals to leave low Earth orbit and to fly to and circle the Moon. Their Zond 5 mission brought them back to Earth safely.

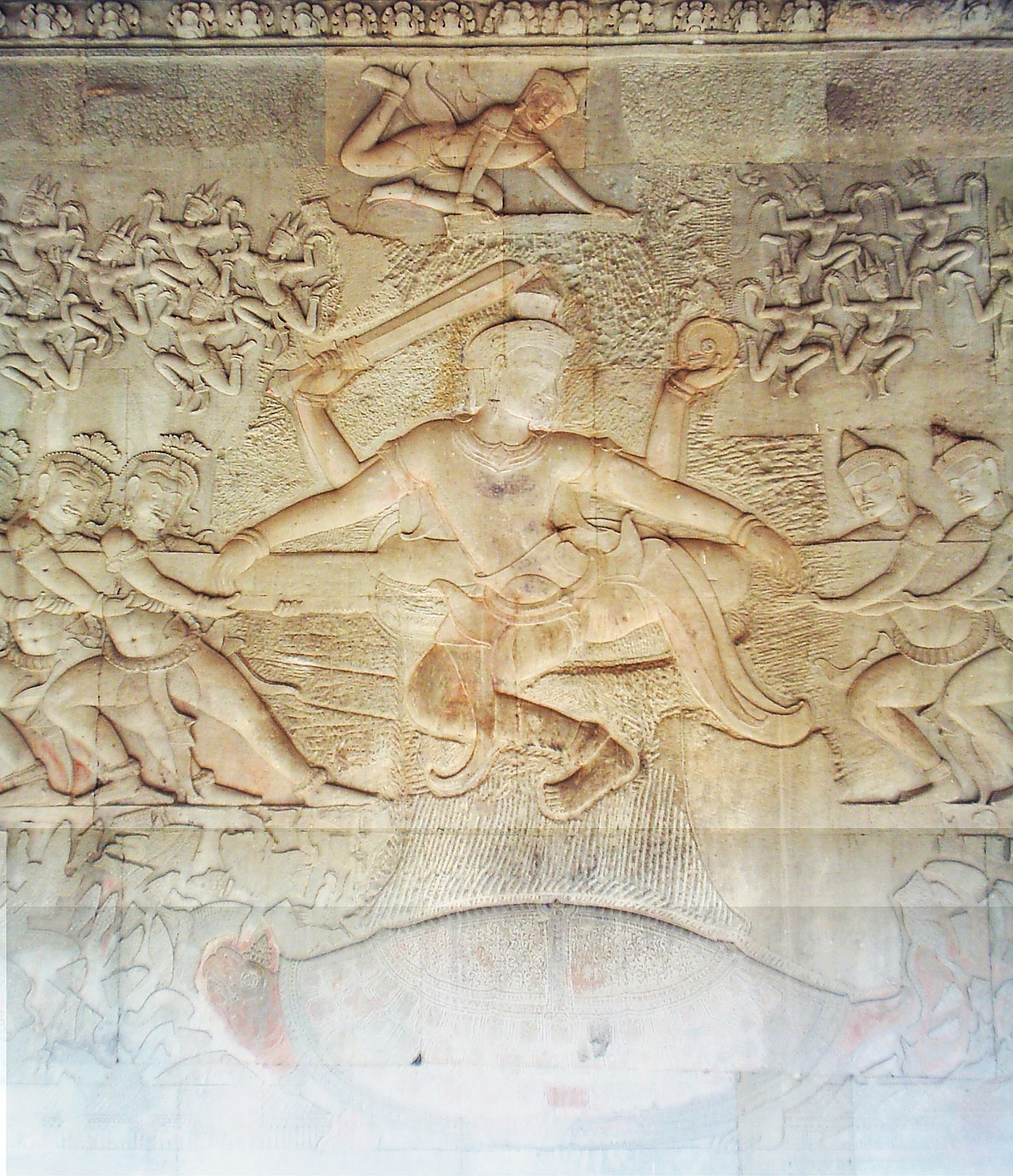
12th century bas-relief from Angkor Wat, Cambodia, shows Samudra manthan-Vishnu in the centre, his turtle Avatar Kurma below, asuras and devas to left and right

Flemish tile depicting a stylised tortoise in The Vyne Chapel, attributed to Guido di Savino, 16th century

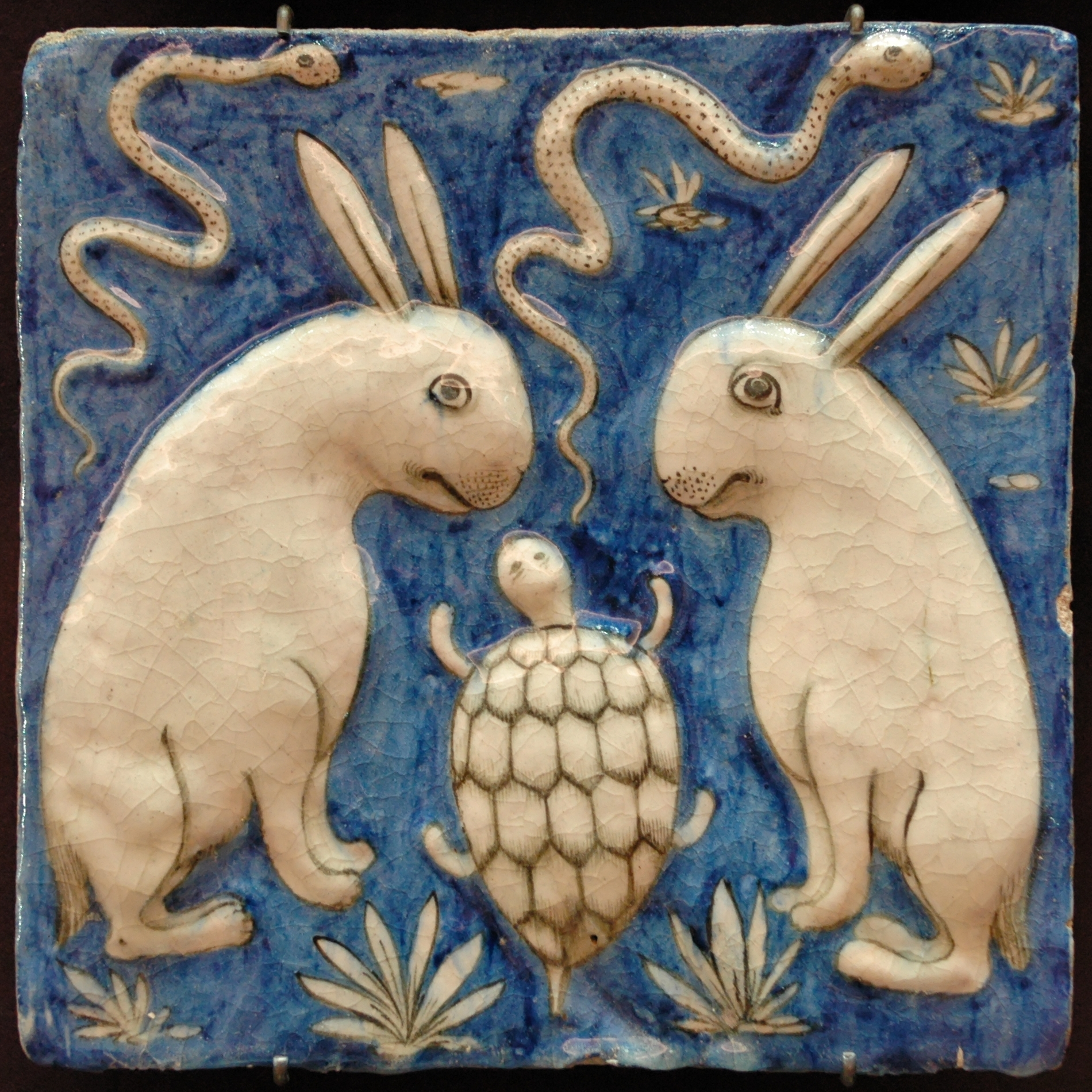
Tile with two rabbits, two snakes, and a tortoise, illustration for Zakariya al-Qazwini's book ʿAjāʾib al-makhlūqāt, Iran, 19th century.

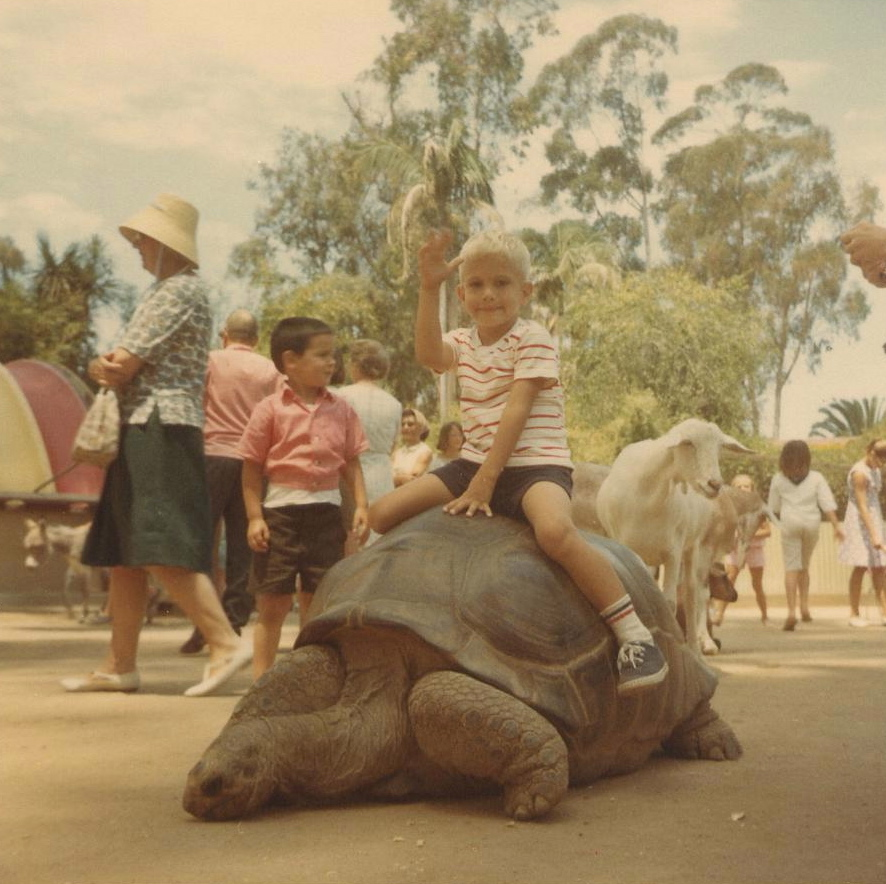
Boy riding a giant tortoise at a zoo

== See also ==
- Jackson ratio
