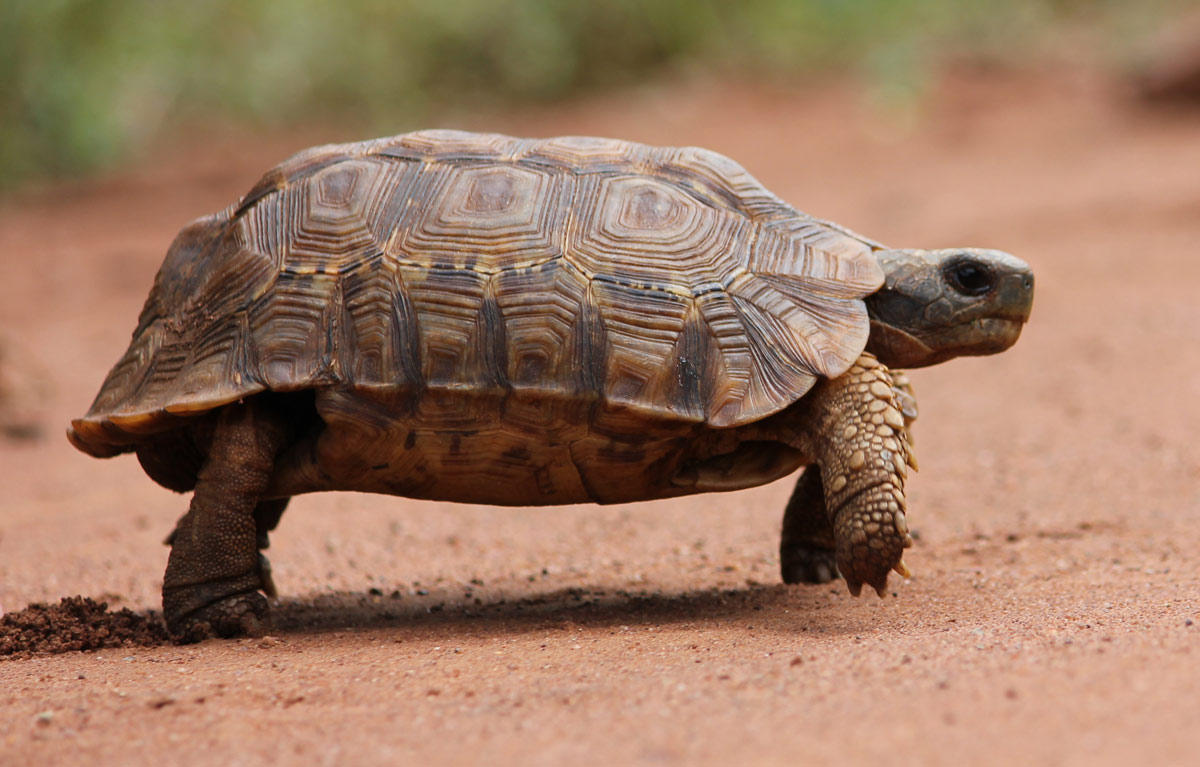

Conservation status
- Vulnerable (IUCN 3.1)

Scientific classification
- Kingdom: Animalia
- Phylum: Chordata
- Class: Reptilia
- Order: Testudines
- Suborder: Cryptodira
- Family: Testudinidae
- Genus: Kinixys
- Species: K. lobatsiana

Binomial name
- Kinixys lobatsiana (Power, 1927)

Synonyms
- Cinixys lobatsiana Power, 1927; Kinixys lobatsiana — Hewitt, 1931; Kinixys belliana lobatsiana — Mertens & Wermuth, 1955; Kinixys belliana lobatisiana — Paull, 1997 (ex errore)

= Lobatse hinge-back tortoise =

Species of tortoise

The Lobatse hinge-back tortoise or Lobatse hinged tortoise (Kinixys lobatsiana) is a species of turtle in the family Testudinidae. It is found in Southern Africa.

== Description ==
This turtle has an elongated, and rather narrow carapace up to 16.7 centimetres (6.6 in), which is slightly domed to flattened with a low, disrupted medial keel.

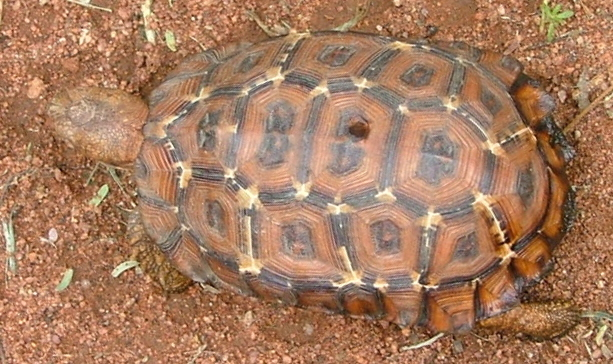
In South Africa

== Range and habitat ==
This species is endemic to Southern Africa and is found in South Africa and Botswana. More specifically, it is restricted to northern South Africa and southeastern Botswana. Here it inhabits Acacia and Combretum woodlands as well as bushveld at elevations of 800–1,500 metres (2,600–4,900 ft) above sea level.
