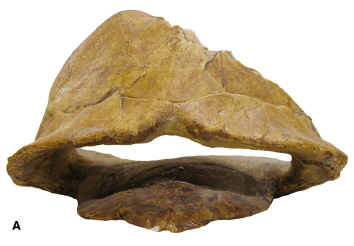

Scientific classification
- Kingdom: Animalia
- Phylum: Chordata
- Class: Reptilia
- Order: Testudines
- Suborder: Cryptodira
- Family: Testudinidae
- Genus: †Alatochelon; Pérez-García, Vlachos, & Murelaga, 2020
- Species: †A. myrteum

Binomial name
- †Alatochelon myrteum Pérez-García, Vlachos, & Murelaga, 2020

= Alatochelon =

Alatochelon Temporal range: Pliocene

Extinct species of tortoise

Alatochelon is an extinct genus of tortoise with a single known species, Alatochelon myrteum.

== Name and speculated origin ==
Alatochelon is derived from the Ancient Greek alato-, meaning salt; and -chelon, meaning turtle. The 'salt' is in reference to the Messinian salinity crisis, during which it is hypothesized that the African spurred tortoise may have crossed over into Europe, and differentiated into Alatochelon myrteum through allopatric speciation. Myrteum is derived from the Latin word 'myrtle', which is believed to be the ancient name of Murica, the region of Spain in which the first fossil of Alatochelon myrteum was found.

== Description ==
Alatochelon myrteum was a large species of tortoise that lived in the lower Pliocene era. As of 2023, the sole fossil found came from the Region of Murcia, Spain; thus its exact range is unknown. Alatochelon myrteum had a tall carapace, and a maximum shell length of at least one meter. Other defining characteristics include a longer-than-wide nuchal scute and a well developed nuchal notch.

== Behavior ==
Alatochelon myrteum was likely herbivorous.
