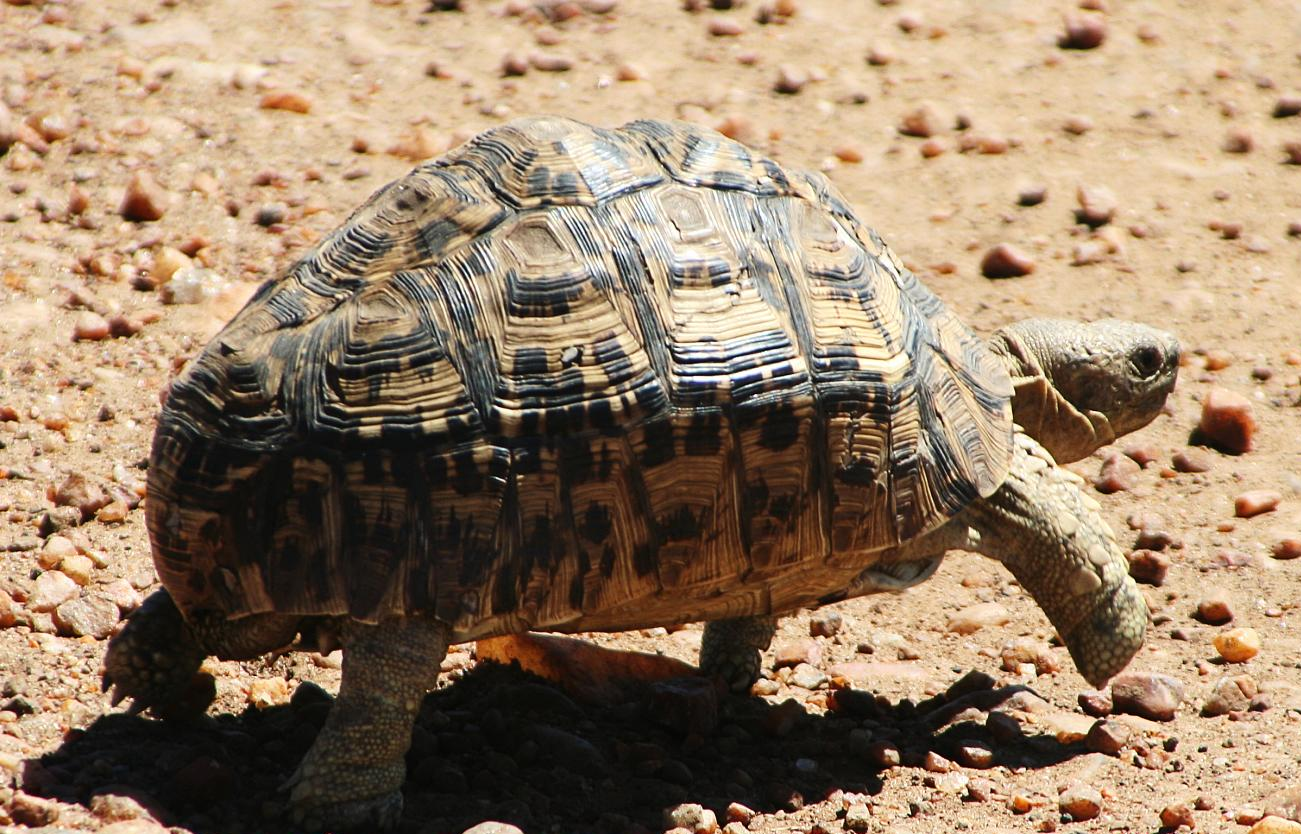
- Leopard tortoise (Stigmochelys pardalis)

Scientific classification
- Kingdom: Animalia
- Phylum: Chordata
- Class: Reptilia
- Order: Testudines
- Suborder: Cryptodira
- Family: Testudinidae
- Genus: Stigmochelys; Gray, 1873

Species
- Stigmochelys pardalis (Bell, 1828); †Stigmochelys brachygularis Meylan and Auffenberg, 1987; †Stigmochelys crassa Andrews, 1914

= Stigmochelys =

Stigmochelys Temporal range: Pliocene–recent

Genus of turtles

Stigmochelys, from Ancient Greek στίγμα (stígma), meaning "spot", and χέλυς (khélus), meaning "turtle", is a genus of tortoise endemic to Africa. Stigmochelys pardalis, the leopard tortoise, is the only extant species. Leopard tortoises were once placed in the genus Geochelone along with many other large tortoises. Two fossil species are known:

- †Stigmochelys brachygularis Laetoli beds, Tanzania, Pliocene carapace length 40–50 centimetres (1.3–1.6 ft).
- †Stigmochelys crassa Kenya, Miocene-Pliocene carpace length >70 centimetres (2.3 ft)
