= Giant tortoise (disambiguation) =

Giant tortoises are any of various large land tortoises

Giant tortoise or giant tortoises may also refer to:

- Galápagos giant tortoise, Chelonoidis nigra are a complex of the largest living species of tortoise.

Pinta giant tortoise or Pinta Island tortoise, Chelonoidis abingdonii, is a species of Galápagos tortoise native to Ecuador's Pinta Island that is most likely extinct since the death of Lonesome George
Volcán Wolf giant tortoise, Chelonoidis becki, is a species of Galápagos tortoise native to the north side of Ecuador's Isabela Island
Narborough Island giant tortoise or Fernandina Island tortoise Chelonoidis phantasticus, is a species of Galápagos tortoise that was last seen in 1906, until a single female individual was rediscovered living on Fernandina Island in February 2019.

- Aldabrachelys, a genus of giant tortoises of the Seychelles and Madagascan radiations

†A. abrupta - Abrupt giant tortoise
†A. grandidieri - Grandidier's giant tortoise
Aldabra giant tortoise, A. gigantea with recognised subspecies:

A. g. arnoldi – Arnold's giant tortoise
†A. g. daudinii – Daudin's giant tortoise
A. g. gigantea – Aldabra giant tortoise
A. g. hololissa – Seychelles giant tortoise, the individual Jonathan being the oldest verified terrestrial animal in the world

- †Cylindraspis an extinct genus of tortoise with the following species:

†C. indica, Réunion giant tortoise, from Réunion
†C. inepta, Saddle-backed Mauritius giant tortoise, from Mauritius
†C. peltastes, Domed Rodrigues giant tortoise, from Rodrigues
†C. triserrata, Domed Mauritius giant tortoise, from Mauritius
†C. vosmaeri, Saddle-backed Rodrigues giant tortoise, from Rodrigues

- †Tenerife giant tortoise, Centrochelys burchardi, a species of tortoise endemic to the island of Tenerife, in the Canary Islands
- †Gran Canaria giant tortoise, Centrochelys vulcanica, a species of tortoise endemic to the island of Gran Canaria, in the Canary Islands
- †Megalochelys atlas, an extinct species of giant tortoise, the largest known tortoise in the fossil record
- Yellow-footed tortoise (Chelonoidis denticulatus), also known as the Brazilian giant tortoise
- Bolson tortoise, (Gopherus flavomarginatus), also known as the Mexican giant tortoise
- "Giant Tortoise", a song by Pond from their 2013 album, Hobo Rocket
- Key: † indicates extinct.

== See also ==
- †Archelon, the largest turtle ever to have been documented
- Largest prehistoric animals - turtles and tortoises section
- Largest reptiles - turtle section
- Large tortoiseshell, a species of butterfly
