= Giant tortoise =

Several species of tortoise

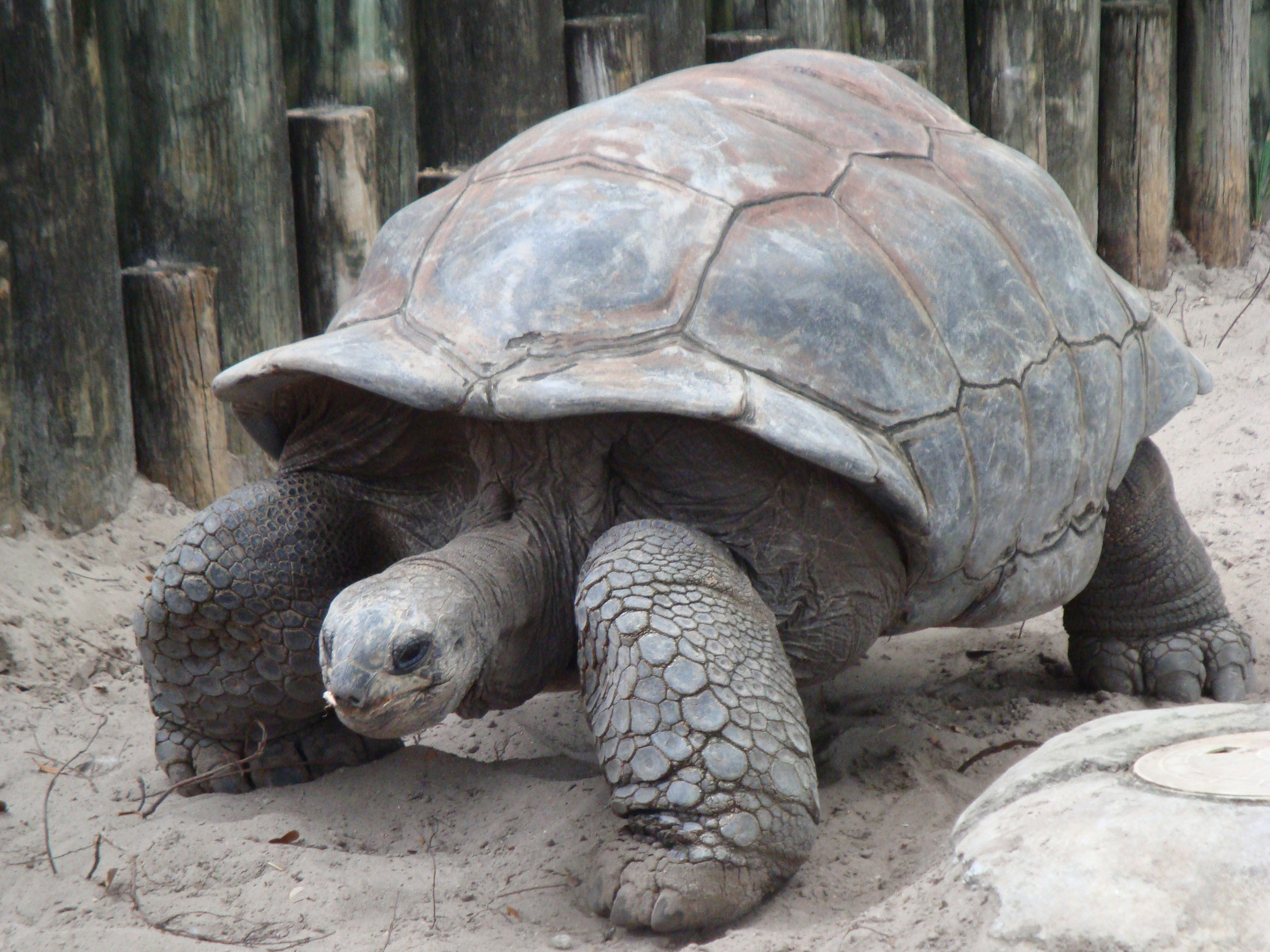
An Aldabra giant tortoise, an example of a giant tortoise.

Giant tortoises are any of several species of various large tortoises, which include a number of extinct species, as well as two extant species with multiple subspecies formerly common on the islands of the western Indian Ocean and on the Galápagos Islands.

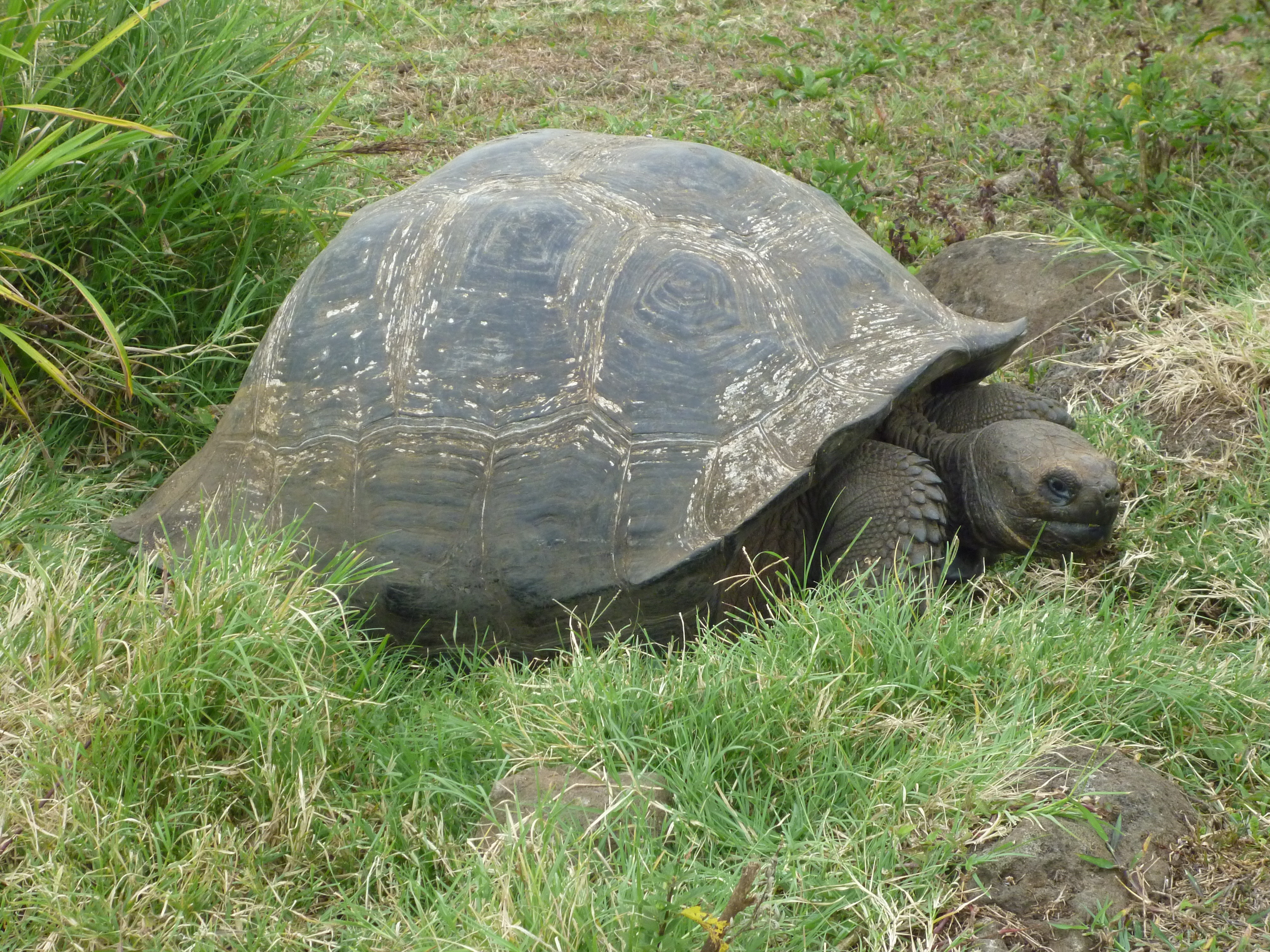
A Galápagos giant tortoise on Santa Cruz Island

== History ==
As of February 2024, two different species of giant tortoise are found on two remote groups of tropical islands: Aldabra Atoll and Fregate Island in the Seychelles and the Galápagos Islands in Ecuador. These tortoises can weigh as much as 417 kg (919 lb) and can grow to be 1.3 m (4 ft 3 in) long. Giant tortoises originally made their way to islands from the mainland via oceanic dispersal. Tortoises are aided in such dispersal by their ability to float with their heads up and to survive for up to six months without food or fresh water.

Giant tortoises were once all placed in a single genus (often referred to as Testudo or Geochelone), but more recent studies have shown that giant tortoises represent several distinct lineages that are not closely related to one another. These lineages appear to have developed large size independently and, as a result, giant tortoises are polyphyletic. For example, the Aldabra Atoll (Aldabrachelys) giant tortoises are related to Malagasy tortoises (Asterochelys) while the Galapagos giant tortoises are related to South American mainland tortoises, particularly the Chaco tortoise (Chelonoidis chiliensis). The recently extinct Mascarene giant tortoises (Cylindraspis) are thought to have belonged to their own branch of the tortoise family, being sister to all other modern tortoise genera aside from Manouria, Gopherus, and Testudo.

Giant tortoises are classified into several distinct genera, including Aldabrachelys, Centrochelys (in part, often excluding the extant African spurred tortoise (Centrochelys sulcata)), Chelonoidis (in part), †Cylindraspis (extinct c. 1840), †Hesperotestudo (extinct c. 9,000 years Before Present), †Megalochelys, †Solitudo, and †Titanochelon. Both Megalochelys and Titanochelon reached sizes substantially greater than modern giant tortoises, with up to 2.4 m (7 ft 10 in) and 2 m (6 ft 7 in) shell lengths respectively.

The phenomenon of animal species evolving to unusually large size on islands (in comparison to continental relatives) is known as island gigantism or insular gigantism. This may occur due to factors such as relaxed predation pressure, competitive release, or as an adaptation to increased environmental fluctuations on islands. However, giant tortoises are no longer considered to be classic examples of island gigantism, as similarly massive tortoises are now known to have once been widespread. Giant tortoises were formerly common (prior to the Quaternary extinctions) across the Cenozoic faunas of Eurasia, Africa and the Americas.

Giant tortoises are notably absent from Australia and the South Pacific. However, extinct giant horned turtles (Meiolaniidae) likely filled a similar niche, with Late Pleistocene-Holocene meiolaniid species being known from Australia, New Caledonia, Lord Howe Island, Vanuatu, and the Fijian Archipelago. The identity of the Vanuatu meiolaniid has been controversial, however, with some studies concluding the remains actually belong to a giant tortoise, which are otherwise unknown from this region. Older (Early Miocene) meiolaniids are also known from the St. Bathans fauna in New Zealand.

Although often considered examples of island gigantism, prior to the arrival of Homo sapiens giant tortoises also occurred in non-island locales, as well as on a number of other, more accessible islands. During the Pleistocene, and mostly during the last 50,000 years, tortoises of the mainland of southern Asia (†Megalochelys atlas), North America (†Hesperotestudo spp.) and South America (Chelonoidis spp.), Indonesia, Madagascar (†Aldabrachelys) and even the island of Malta all became extinct.

Giant tortoises (†Titanochelon) also inhabited mainland Europe until the Early Pleistocene (2.0 Mya). The giant tortoises formerly of Africa died out somewhat earlier, during the Late Pliocene. While the timing of the disappearances of various extinct giant tortoise species seems to correlate with the arrival of humans, direct evidence for human involvement in these extinctions is usually lacking; however, such evidence has been obtained in the case of the distantly-related giant meiolaniid turtle Meiolania damelipi in Vanuatu. One interesting relic is the shell of an extinct giant tortoise found in a submerged sinkhole in Florida with a wooden spear piercing through it, carbon dated to 12,000 years ago.

Today, only one of the subspecies of the Indian Ocean survives in the wild; the Aldabra giant tortoise (two more are claimed to exist in captive or re-released populations, but some genetic studies have cast doubt on the validity of these as separate species) and 10 extant species in the Galápagos.

== Life expectancy ==
Giant tortoises are among the world's longest-living animals, with an average lifespan of 100 years or more. The Madagascar radiated tortoise Tu'i Malila was 188 at her death in Tonga in 1965. Harriet (initially thought to be one of the three Galápagos tortoises brought back to England from Charles Darwin's Beagle voyage, but later shown to be from an island not even visited by Darwin) was reported by the Australia Zoo to be 176 years old when she died in 2006.

On 23 March 2006, an Aldabra giant tortoise named Adwaita died at the Alipore Zoological Gardens in Kolkata. He was brought to the zoo in the 1870s from the estate of Lord Clive and is thought to have been around 255 years old when he died. Around the time of its discovery, they were caught for food in such large numbers that they became virtually extinct by 1900. Giant tortoises are now protected by strict conservation laws and are categorized as threatened species.

== List of insular species ==
Taxonomy of extant and extinct insular giant tortoise species follows Rhodin et al. (2021), unless otherwise noted.

=== Aldabrachelys ===
Archipelago	Island	Species
Seychelles	Granitic Seychelles (Note: Cerf Island, Cousine Island, Frégate Island, Mahé, Praslin, Round Island, and Silhouette Island.) (Note: Exact geographic range of these subspecies prior to human arrival is unknown, especially as tortoises have been moved between islands, but populations of Aldabrachelys are known to have existed at one time on all of these islands.)	Arnold's giant tortoise (A. gigantea arnoldi); †Daudin's giant tortoise (A. gigantea daudinii); Seychelles giant tortoise (A. gigantea hololissa)
Seychelles	Aldabra Atoll	Aldabra giant tortoise (A. gigantea gigantea)
Seychelles	Cosmoledo	†Aldabrachelys sp.
Seychelles	Denis Island	†Aldabrachelys sp.
Seychelles	Assumption Island	†Aldabrachelys sp.
Seychelles	Astove Atoll	†Aldabrachelys sp.
Glorioso Islands	Glorioso Islands	†Aldabrachelys sp.
Comoro Islands	Comoro Islands	†Aldabrachelys sp.
Madagascar	Madagascar	†Abrupt giant tortoise (A. abrupta); †Grandidier's giant tortoise (A. grandidieri)

=== Chelonoidis ===
Archipelago	Island	Species
Galápagos Islands	San Cristóbal	San Cristobal giant tortoise (C. niger chathamensis)
Galápagos Islands	Isabela	Volcán Wolf giant tortoise (C. niger becki); Southern Isabela giant tortoise (C. niger vicina)
Galápagos Islands	Santiago	Santiago Island giant tortoise (C. niger darwini)
Galápagos Islands	Santa Cruz	Eastern Santa Cruz giant tortoise (C. niger donfaustoi); Western Santa Cruz tortoise (C. niger porteri)
Galápagos Islands	Ferdandina	Fernandina Island Galápagos tortoise (C. niger phantastica)
Galápagos Islands	Pinta	†Pinta Island tortoise (C. niger abingdonii)
Galápagos Islands	Floreana	†Floreana Island tortoise (C. niger niger)
Galápagos Islands	Pinzón	Pinzón Island giant tortoise (C. niger duncanensis)
Galápagos Islands	Española	Hood Island giant tortoise (C. niger hoodensis)
Galápagos Islands	Santa Fe	†Santa Fe Island tortoise (C. niger ssp.)
Lucayan Archipelago	Andros	†Abaco tortoise (C. alburyorum alburyorum)
Lucayan Archipelago	Nassau	†Abaco tortoise (C. alburyorum alburyorum)
Lucayan Archipelago	Mayaguana	†Abaco tortoise (C. alburyorum alburyorum)
Lucayan Archipelago	Crooked Island	†Abaco tortoise (C. alburyorum alburyorum)
Lucayan Archipelago	Gran Abaco	†Abaco tortoise (C. alburyorum alburyorum)
Lucayan Archipelago	Grand Turk	†Turks tortoise (C. alburyorum keegani)
Lucayan Archipelago	Middle Caicos	†Caicos tortoise (C. alburyorum sementis)
Greater Antilles	Cuba	†Cuban giant tortoise (C. cubensis)
Greater Antilles	Hispaniola	†Northern Hispaniola tortoise (C. dominicensis); †Southern Hispaniola tortoise (C. marcanoi)
Greater Antilles	Mona	†Mona tortoise (C. monensis)
Greater Antilles	Navassa	†Chelonoidis sp.
Lesser Antilles	Sombrero	†Sombrero tortoise (C. sombrerensis)
Lesser Antilles	Curaçao	†Chelonoidis sp.

=== Other genera ===
Archipelago	Island	Species
Mascarene Islands	Réunion	†Réunion giant tortoise (Cylindraspis indica)
Mascarene Islands	Rodrigues	†Domed Rodrigues giant tortoise (Cylindraspis peltastes); †Saddle-backed Rodrigues giant tortoise (Cylindraspis vosmaeri)
Mascarene Islands	Mauritius	†Saddle-backed Mauritius giant tortoise (Cylindraspis inepta); †Domed Mauritius giant tortoise (Cylindraspis triserrata)
Malta	Malta	†Centrochelys robusta (Note: Often treated as Centrochelys but Pérez-García et al. (2017) suggests it could pertain to Titanochelon.)
Canary Islands	Tenerife	†Tenerife giant tortoise ("Centrochelys" burchardi)
Canary Islands	Gran Canaria	†Gran Canaria giant tortoise ("Centrochelys" vulcanica)

== Aldabra giant tortoise ==
The Aldabra giant tortoise (Aldabrachelys gigantea) lives on the remote Aldabra Atoll, one of the Seychelles group of islands in the Indian Ocean It is the only living species in the genus Aldabrachelys. Two other species in the genus, Aldabrachelys abrupta, and Aldabrachelys grandidieri were formerly endemic to Madagascar, but became extinct after the arrival of people.

=== Distribution and habitat ===
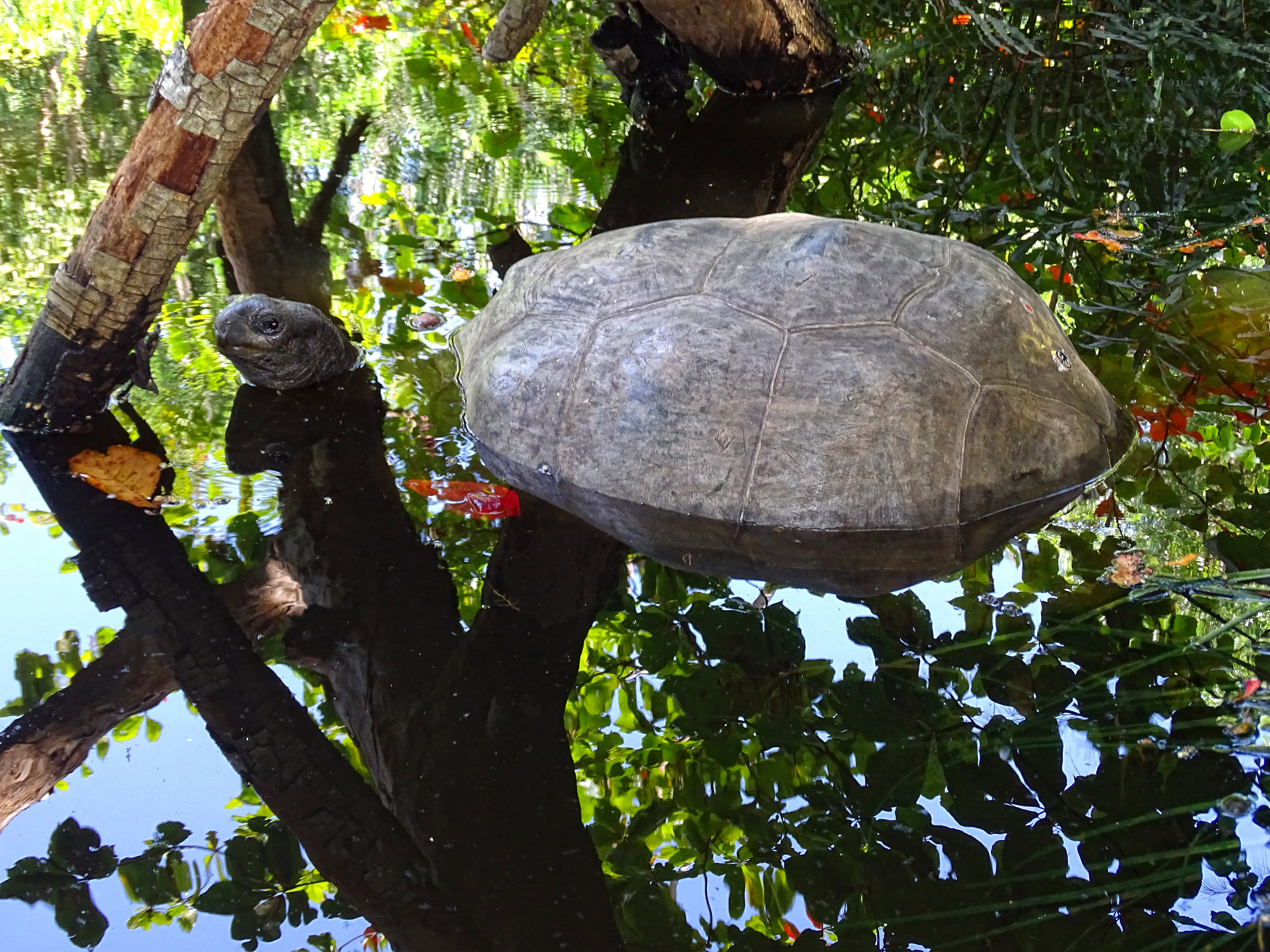
An Aldabra giant tortoise cooling down in a freshwater pond on Curieuse, Seychelles

Aldabra giant tortoises have large dome-shaped shells in order to protect their delicate bodies that lie beneath their shells. They also have long necks in order to eat leaves from the higher branches of trees. The males, although not much bigger than the females, weigh nearly 100 kg (220 lbs) more. They move slowly and have small, thick legs and round, almost flat feet that assist them in walking on sand.

The Aldabra giant tortoise mainly inhabits grasslands and swamps on Aldabra Atoll's islands, which form a part of the Seychelles island chain in the Indian Ocean. In the past, they shared the islands with multiple other giant tortoise species, but many of them were hunted to extinction in the 1700s and 1800s. Despite the fact that they are usually found in regions of dense low-lying vegetation, they have been known to wander into areas with more sparse vegetation and rocks when food is scarce. They can also be seen resting in shaded areas or shallow pools of water in order to cool themselves on hot days. Aldabra giant tortoises tend to spend their lives grazing, but will cover surprising distances in search of food and have also been observed on bare rock and thin soil. They can drink from very shallow pools through their nostrils; the former genus Dipsochelys refers to this adaptation.

== Galápagos giant tortoise ==
The closest living relative of the Galápagos giant tortoise (Chelonoidis niger) is the small Chaco tortoise from South America, although it is not a direct ancestor. Scientists believe the first tortoises arrived to the Galápagos 2–3 million years ago by drifting 600 miles from the South American coast on vegetation rafts or on their own. They were already large animals before arriving in the Galápagos. Colonizing the easternmost islands of Española and San Cristóbal first, they then dispersed throughout the archipelago, eventually establishing about 16 separate populations on 10 of the largest of the Galápagos Islands. Currently, there are only 10 subspecies of Galápagos giant tortoises left of the original 16 subspecies. During the 16th and 17th centuries, the Galápagos were frequented by buccaneers preying on Spanish treasure ships. Filling a ship's hold with tortoises was an easy way to stock up on food, a tradition that was continued by whalers in the centuries that followed. The tortoises also conveniently held water in their necks that could be used as drinking water.

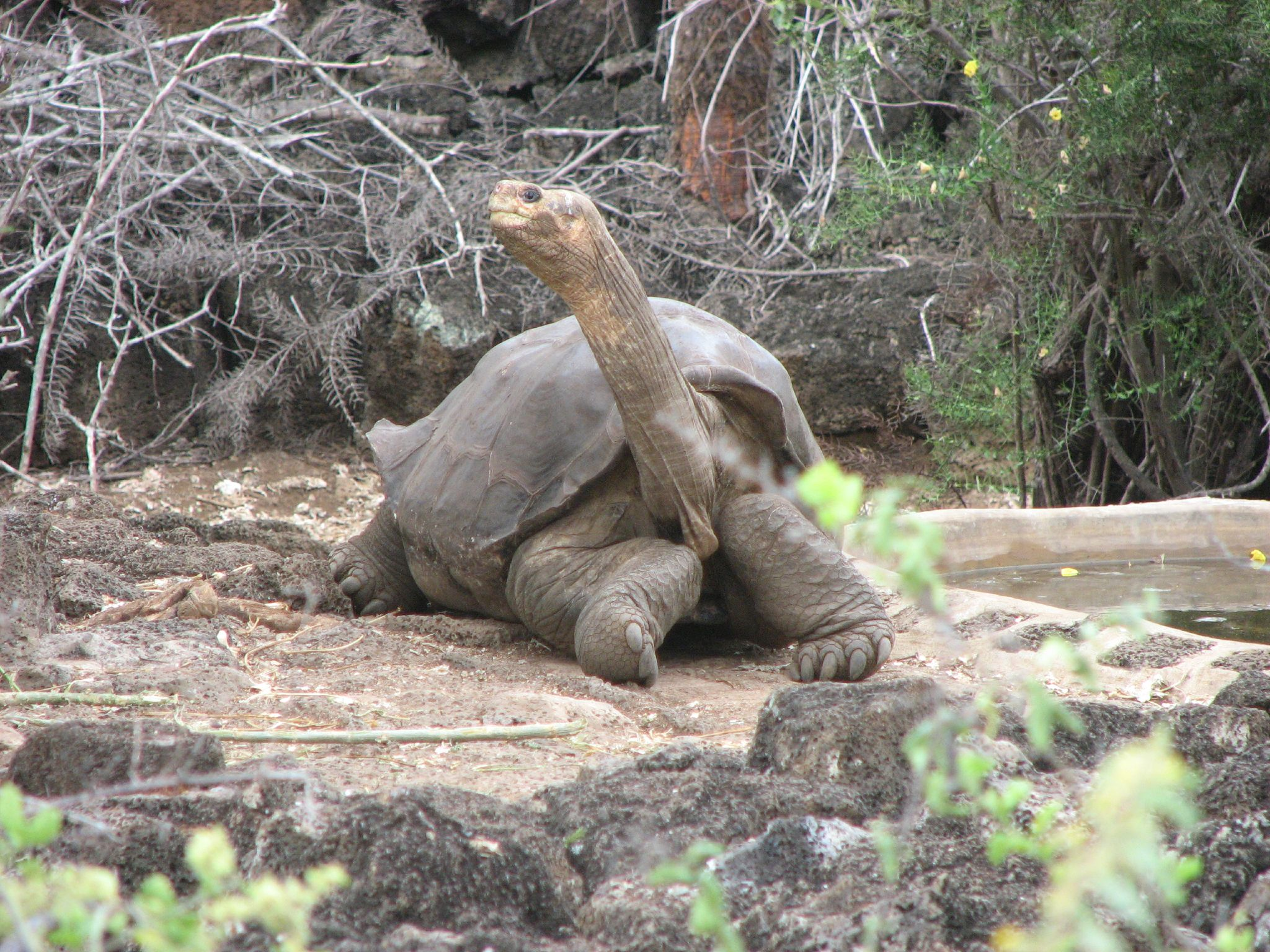
Lonesome George, the last known individual of the Pinta giant tortoise (C. n. abingdonii)

These buccaneers stocked giant tortoises not only because of their meat but because of these animals' ability to survive for six months to one year without food or water. Once buccaneers, whalers and fur sealers discovered that they could have fresh meat for their long voyages by storing live giant tortoises in the holds of their ships, massive exploitation of the species began. Tortoises were also exploited for their oil, which was used to light the lamps of Quito.

Two centuries of exploitation resulted in the loss of between 100,000 and 200,000 tortoises. Three subspecies have been extinct since the 19th century, and a fourth subspecies lost its last member, Lonesome George, in June 2012. In February 2019, a tortoise subspecies once thought to have been extinct since 1906, the Fernandina giant tortoise, was discovered on its namesake island in the Galápagos. It is estimated that 20,000–25,000 wild tortoises live on the islands today.

=== Distribution and habitat ===
Galápagos tortoises are mainly herbivorous, feeding primarily on cactus pads, grasses, and native fruit, but have been recorded eating baby birds in the case of the aldabran species. They drink large quantities of water when available that they can store in their bladders for long periods of time. There are two main types of shell among them, the saddle-backed shell and the domed shell. They both provide special adaption to different environments. The saddle-backed tortoises are the smallest Galápagos tortoises, but present a very long neck and pairs of legs. They live on arid zone and feed on cactus. The domed tortoises are bigger with shorter neck and legs, they are found in the more vegetated islands and feed on grass.

They spend an average of 16 hours a day resting. Their activity level is driven by ambient temperature and food availability. In the cool season, they are active at midday, sleeping in during the morning and afternoon. In the hot season, their active period is early morning and late afternoon, while midday finds them resting and trying to keep cool under the shade of a bush or half-submerged in muddy wallows.

=== Life cycle ===
Tortoises breed primarily during the hot season from January to May; however, tortoises can be seen mating any month of the year. During the cool season (June to November), female tortoises migrate to nesting zones, which are generally located in low lands of the islands, to lay their eggs. A female can lay from 1–4 nests over a nesting season from June to December. She digs the hole with her hind feet, then lets the eggs drop down into the nest, and finally covers it again with her hind feet. The number of eggs ranges from 2 to 7 for saddle-backed tortoises to sometimes more than 20 to 25 eggs for domed tortoises.

The eggs incubate from 110 to 175 days (incubation periods depend on the month the clutch was produced, with eggs laid early in the cool season requiring longer incubation periods than eggs laid at the end of the cool season, when the majority of their incubation will occur at the start of the hot season). After hatching, the young hatchlings remain in the nest for a few weeks before emerging out a small hole adjacent to the nest cap. Usually, the temperature of the nest influences on the sex of the hatchling. Warm temperatures would yield more females, while colder temperatures would yield more males.

== Mascarenes giant tortoises ==
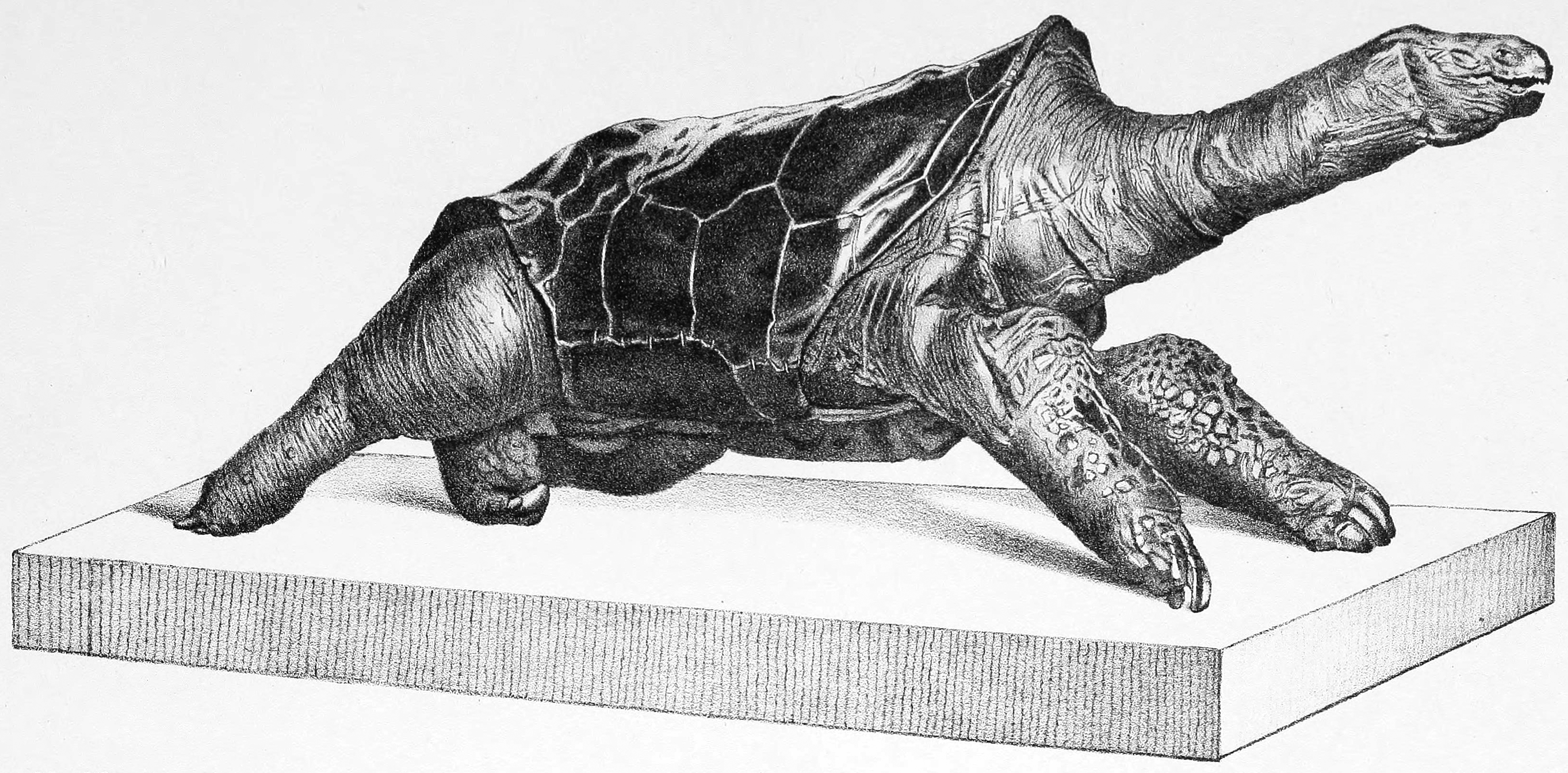
Drawing of a stuffed specimen

The Mascarene Islands of Mauritius, Réunion and Rodrigues once harboured five species of giant tortoise belonging to the extinct genus Cylindraspis, comprising two species occurring on Mauritius, another two on Rodrigues, and one on Réunion. The tortoises were unique to these islands and had gained a number of special adaptations in the absence of ground predators. They differed from any other giant tortoise species because of their modified jaws, reduced scales on the legs and shells averaging just 1mm thick. The shells of the giant tortoises were open-ended; the name Cylindraspis actually means "cylinder-shaped". This was a specific adaptation in response to the lack of predators, where thick, heavily armored shells were no longer necessary.

They belonged to a far more ancient lineage than the two extant giant tortoises, having diverged from all other tortoises during the Eocene, with divergence between the individual species far greater than that between the insular subspecies of the extant tortoises. The divergences between some Cylindraspis species are thought to be even older than the geologic history of the modern Mascarenes themselves, indicating that Cylindraspis originally inhabited several now-submerged island chains of the Mascarene Plateau before colonizing the modern Mascarene islands following their formation.

Around the 16th century, with human arrival and the subsequent introduction of domestic animals, particularly pigs, the tortoises were hunted to extinction. The thin shells were of no protection against these new invaders; rats, cats and pigs devoured the eggs and young and thousands were collected alive for provisioning ships. Sometimes they were even hunted for their oil, which was very valuable around that time because it provided a cure for many ailments, including scurvy.

On Mauritius, the giant tortoise disappeared from the main island by the end of the 17th century and the very last tortoises survived until the 1730s on the islets in the north. Around the late 1800s, large number of tortoise bones were discovered in the Mare aux Songes excavations. These resulted in the description of the two species of giant tortoise endemic to Mauritius, the Mauritius saddle-backed (Cylindraspis inepta) and the Mauritius domed (Cylindraspis triserrata).

Today, the only remains from these five species are a number of fossil bones and shells, a few drawings of live animals and one stuffed Rodrigues saddle-backed giant tortoise in France's National Museum of Natural History.

== See also ==
- Island gigantism
