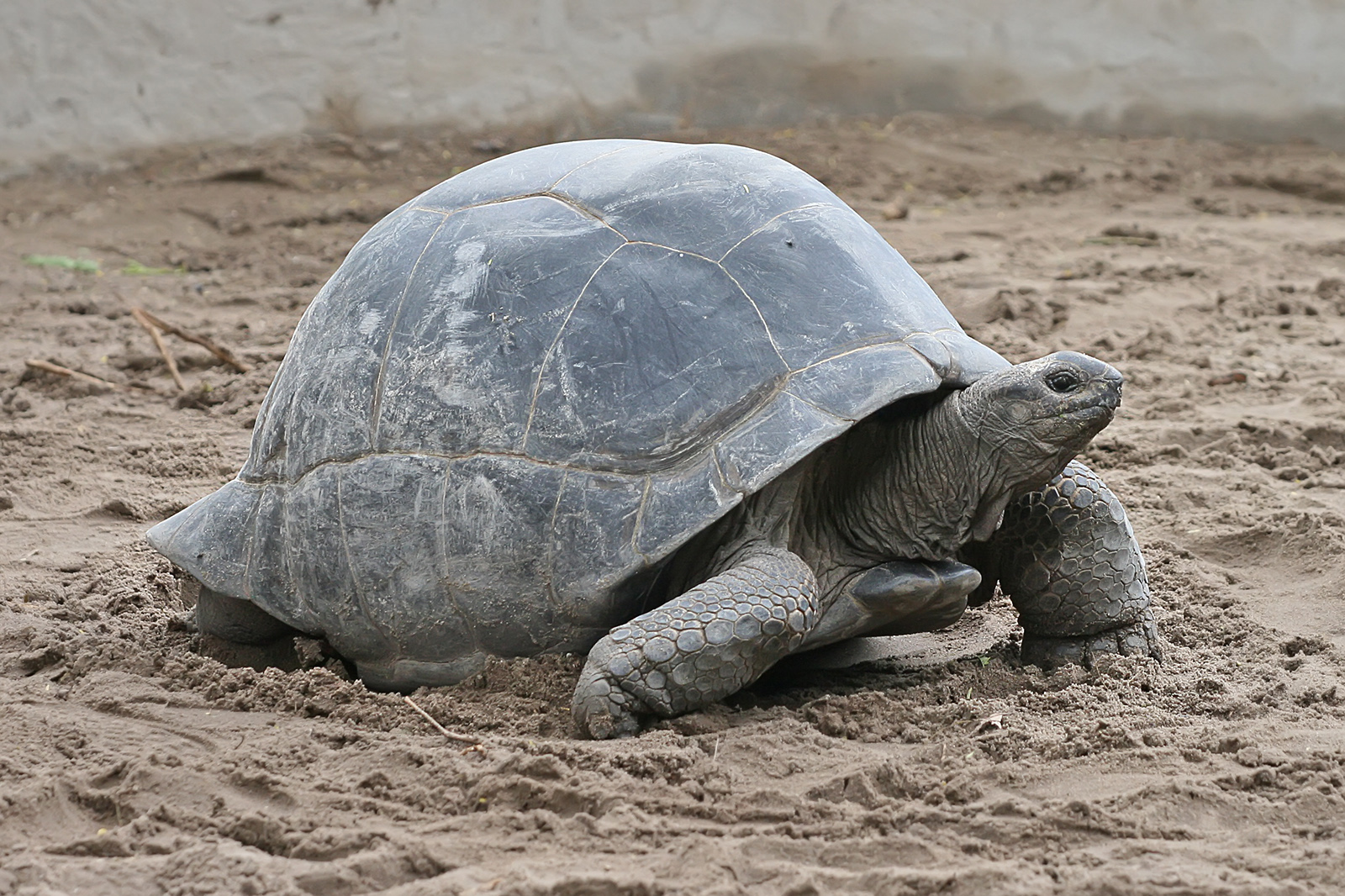

Scientific classification
- Kingdom: Animalia
- Phylum: Chordata
- Class: Reptilia
- Order: Testudines
- Suborder: Cryptodira
- Family: Testudinidae
- Genus: Aldabrachelys; Loveridge & E. Williams, 1957

Species
- †Aldabrachelys abrupta; †Aldabrachelys grandidieri; Aldabrachelys gigantea

Synonyms
- Dipsochelys Bour, 1982

= Aldabrachelys =

Genus of tortoises

Aldabrachelys is genus of giant tortoises, including the Aldabra giant tortoise (Aldabrachelys gigantea) native to the Seychelles, as well as two recently extinct species, Aldabrachelys abrupta and Aldabrachelys grandidieri known from Madagascar. The genus name derives from Aldabra, a coral atoll in the Seychelles, plus Greek, chelys (χέλυς), for "tortoise" or "lyre", since Hermes made the first lyre from a hollowed out tortoise shell.

== Naming ==
This name is problematic in that the type specimen actually represents Chelonoidis denticulata; however, this was discussed and petitioned before the ICZN and accepted: the name Aldabrachelys is therefore the correct name for this genus.

== Taxonomy ==
Within Testudinidae, Aldabrachelys is most closely related to Astrochelys and Pyxis, which are also native to Madagascar, suggesting that they share a common origin on the island. Within the genus, Aldabrachelys abrupta is more closely related to A. gigantea than it is to A. grandidieri, but A. abrupta and A. gigantea are relatively genetically divergent, suggesting that they are not synonymous as had sometimes been previously proposed, and that they diverged from each other several million years ago. The proposed subspecies of A. gigantea show relatively little genetic differentiation from each other.

== See also ==
- Cylindraspis extinct genus of giant tortoise formerly native to the Mascarene islands of Mauritius, Reunion and Rodrigues
