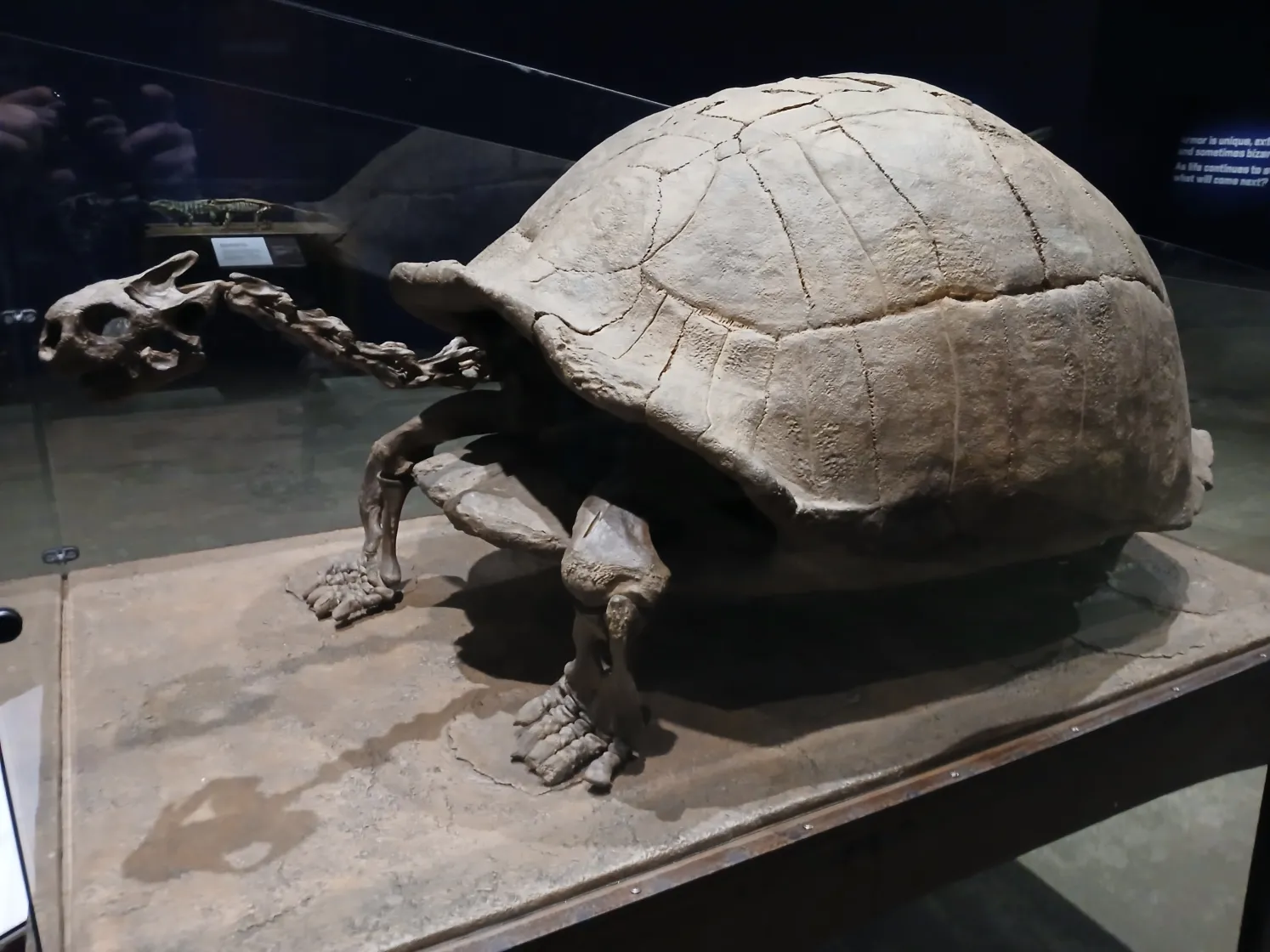
- Skeletal reconstruction of Hesperotestudo sp.
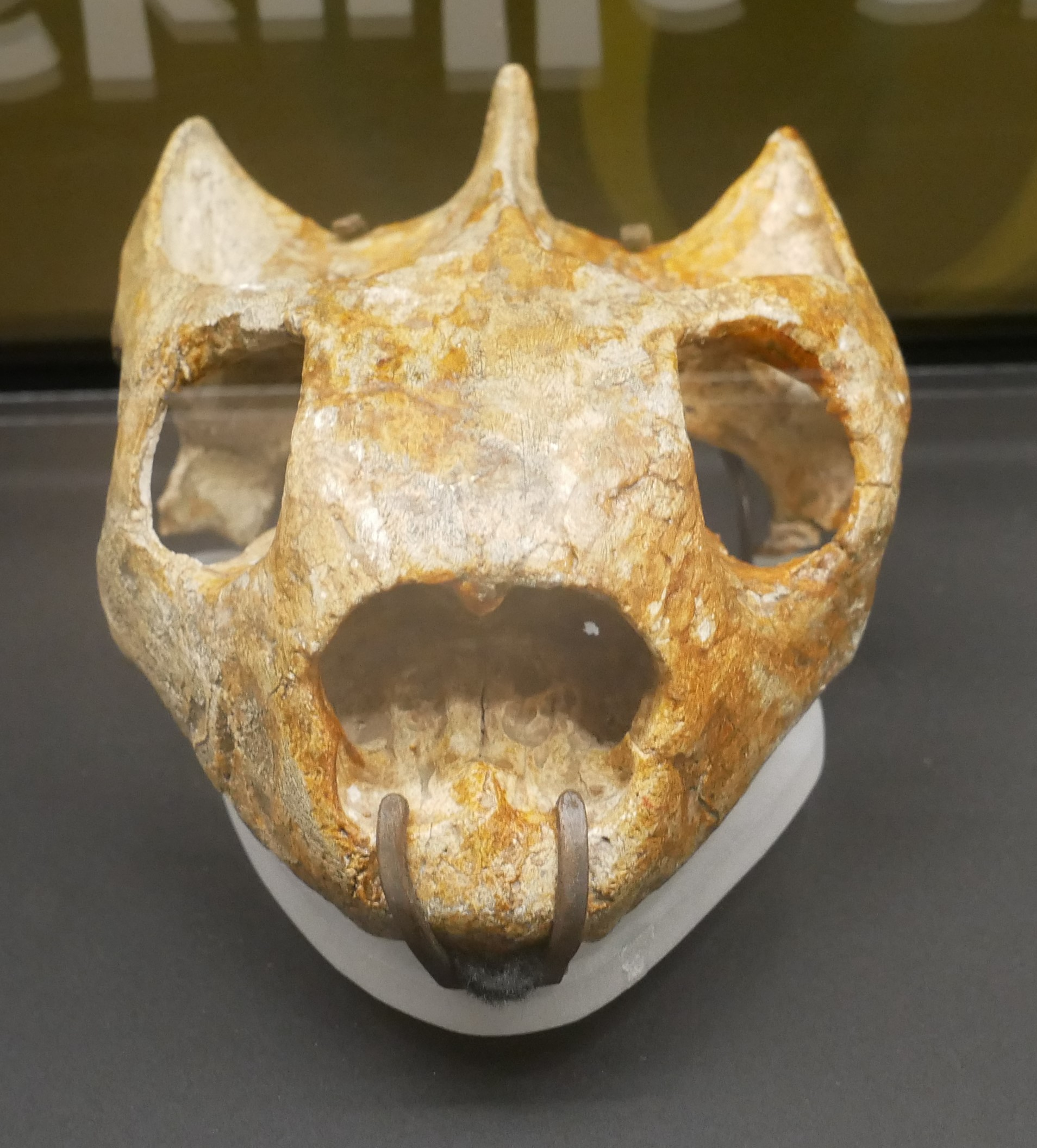
- Skull of Hesperotestudo osborniana

Scientific classification
- Kingdom: Animalia
- Phylum: Chordata
- Class: Reptilia
- Order: Testudines
- Suborder: Cryptodira
- Family: Testudinidae
- Genus: †Hesperotestudo; Williams, 1950

Type species
- Hesperotestudo osborniana (Hay, 1904)

Species
- See text

Synonyms
- Geochelone crassiscutata

= Hesperotestudo =

Hesperotestudo Temporal range: Early Miocene–Late Pleistocene

Genus of turtle

Hesperotestudo ("Western turtle") is an extinct genus of tortoise native to North and Central America (ranging as far south as Costa Rica) from the Early Miocene to the Late Pleistocene. Species of Hesperotestudo varied widely in size, with a large undescribed specimen from the Late Pleistocene of El Salvador reaching 150 cm (4.9 ft) in carapace length, larger than that of extant giant tortoises. Historically considered a subgenus of Geochelone, it is now considered to be distantly related to that genus. Its relationships with other tortoises are uncertain. The exposed areas of the bodies of Hesperotestudo species were extensively covered with large dermal ossicles, which in life were covered in keratin. It has been suggested that species of Hesperotestudo were relatively tolerant of cold weather. Hesperotestudo became extinct at the end of the Pleistocene roughly co-incident with the arrival of the first humans in North America. There is apparently a site in Florida where one individual may have been killed that some suggested were evidence of butchering, although others suggested that the turtle was neither cooked nor does a ledge that was found near it date at the same time as it.

== Taxonomy ==
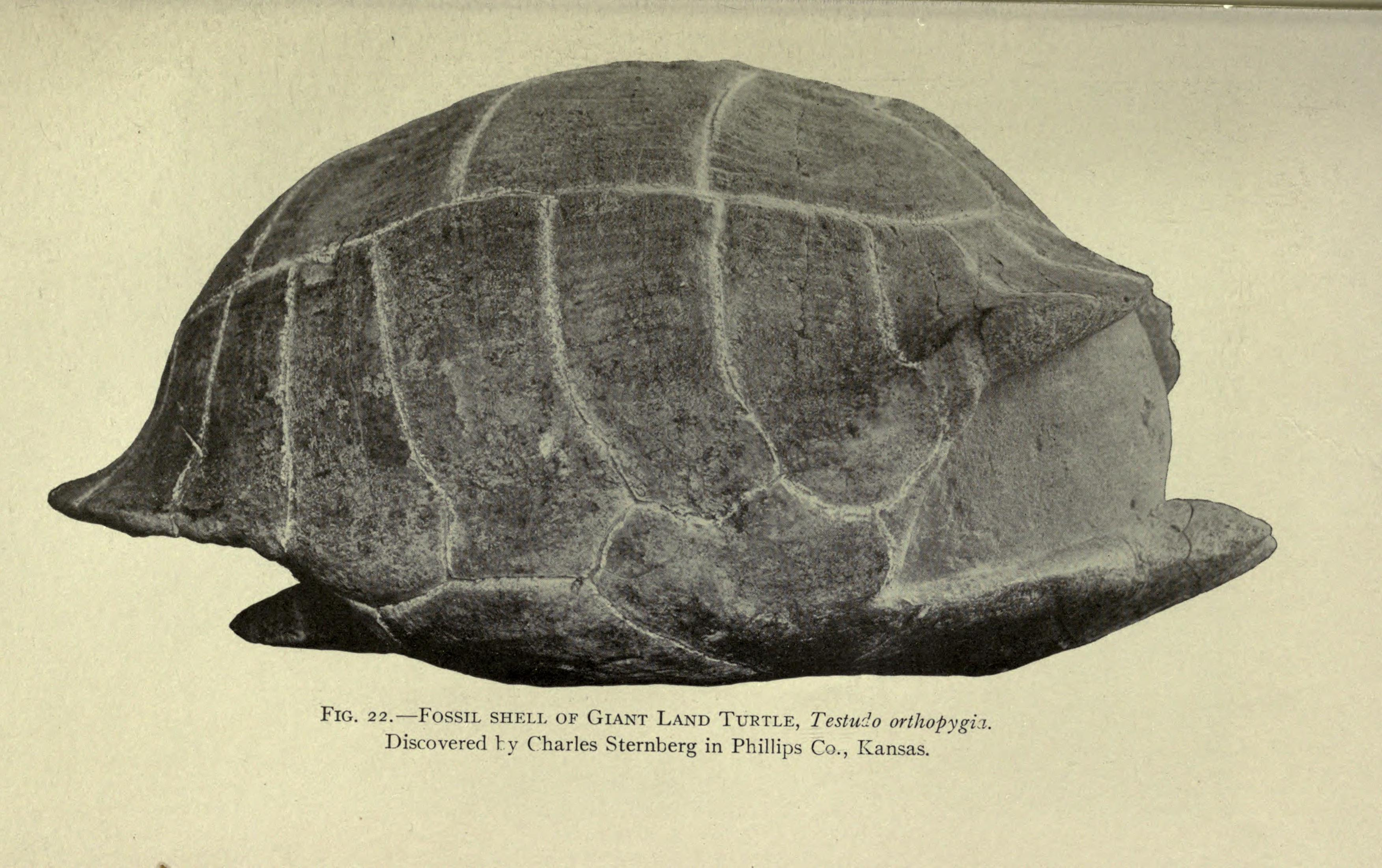
An illustration of the shell of Hesperotestudo orthopygia

Species list is based on Vlachos, 2018

- † Hesperotestudo Williams 1950
  - †Hesperotestudo bermudae Meylan and Sterrer 2000 Bermuda, Middle Pleistocene c. 310,000 years before present (YBP) - shell length c. 50 centimetres (1.6 ft)
  - †Hesperotestudo crassiscutata (Leidy 1889) Florida, Texas, Illinois, South Carolina, (possibly also El Salvador) Middle-Late Pleistocene shell length c. 120–125 centimetres (3.94–4.10 ft)
  - †Hesperotestudo ducateli (Collins and Lynn, 1936) Calvert Formation, Maryland, Middle Miocene (Langhian–Serravallian)
  - †Hesperotestudo gilbertii (Hay, 1899) Ogallala Formation, Kansas, Hemphillian, Late Miocene-Early Pliocene (Tortonian–Zanclean)
  - †Hesperotestudo orthopygia (Cope, 1878) (syn= Xerobates cyclopygius Cope, 1878 =Caryoderma snovianum Cope, 1886 = Testudo rexroadensis Oelrich, 1952 = Geochelone nordensis Holman, 1973) Kansas, California, Nebraska, Late Miocene-Pliocene shell length c. 120 centimetres (3.9 ft)
  - †Hesperotestudo osborniana (Hay, 1905)(syn= Testudo arenivaga Hay, 1906 = Testudo farri Hay, 1908 = Testudo impensa Hay, 1908 = Testudo orthopygia angusticeps Matthew, 1924) Colorado, Nebraska, Montana, Early Miocene-Early Pliocene shell length up to 92 centimetres (3.02 ft)
  - †Hesperotestudo turgida (Cope, 1892) (syn = Testudo incisa Hay, 1916a = Testudo riggsi Hibbard, 1944 = Testudo wilsoni Milstead, 1956 = Geochelone johnstoni Auffenberg 1962 = Geochelone alleni Auffenberg, 1966 = Geochelone oelrichi Holman, 1972a = Geochelone mlynarskii Auffenberg, 1988) Florida, Oklahoma, Kansas, Texas, Nebraska, Late Miocene-Late Pleistocene shell length c. 22–25 centimetres (0.72–0.82 ft)
  - †Hesperotestudo williamsi (Auffenberg, 1964) Oakville Formation, Texas, Early Miocene (Burdigalian) shell length c. 33.4 centimetres (1.10 ft)
