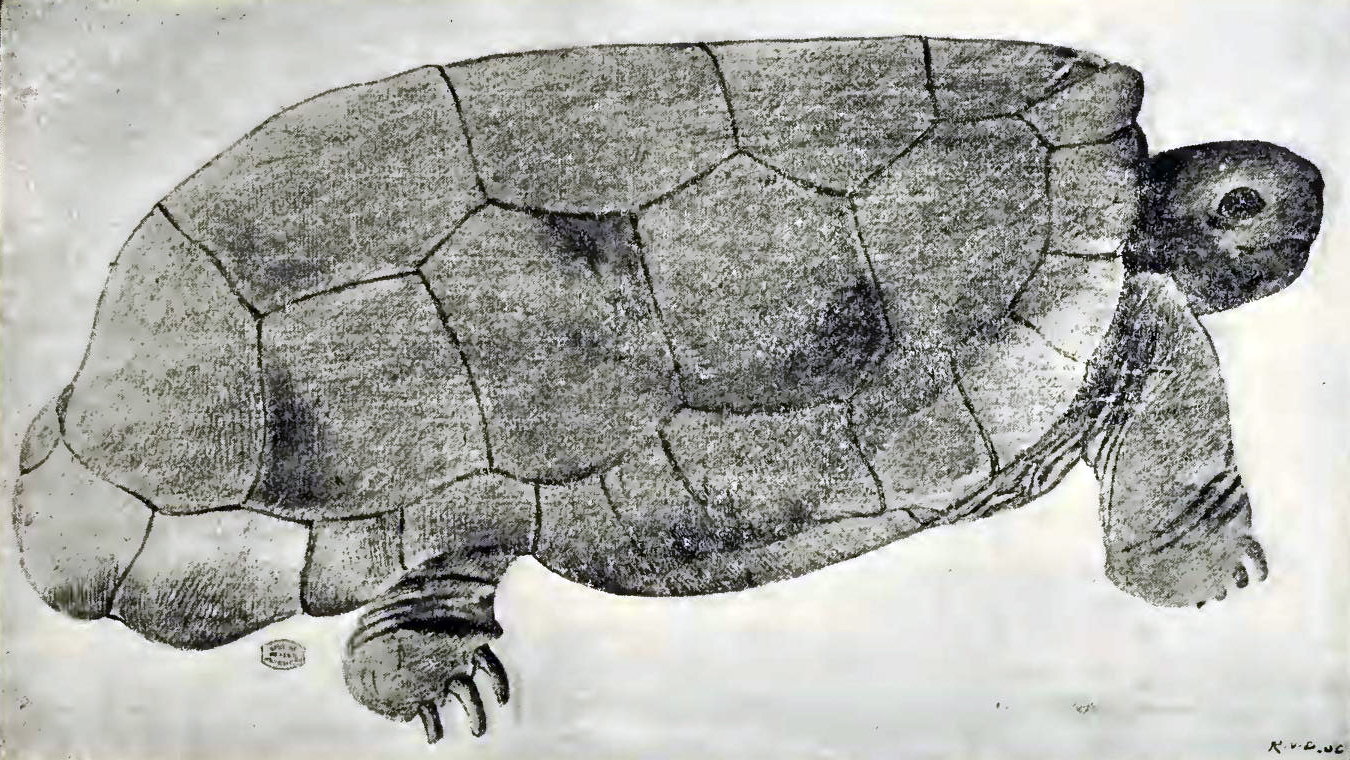
- Illustration of a live specimen from ca. 1770 by Paul de Jossigny

Conservation status
- Extinct (around 1800) (IUCN 2.3)

Scientific classification
- Kingdom: Animalia
- Phylum: Chordata
- Class: Reptilia
- Order: Testudines
- Suborder: Cryptodira
- Family: Testudinidae
- Genus: †Cylindraspis
- Species: †C. peltastes

Binomial name
- †Cylindraspis peltastes Dumeril & Bibron, 1835

Synonyms
- List: Testudo rotunda Latreille, 1801; Chersine rotunda Merrem, 1820; Testudo peltastes Duméril & Bibron, 1835; Geochelone (Geochelone) rotunda Fitzinger, 1835; Geochelone peltastes Pritchard, 1967; Cylindraspis peltastes Bour, 1980

= Domed Rodrigues giant tortoise =

Extinct species of tortoise

The domed Rodrigues giant tortoise (Cylindraspis peltastes) is an extinct species of giant tortoise in the family Testudinidae. It was endemic to Rodrigues. It appears to have become extinct around 1800, as a result of human exploitation.

== Description ==
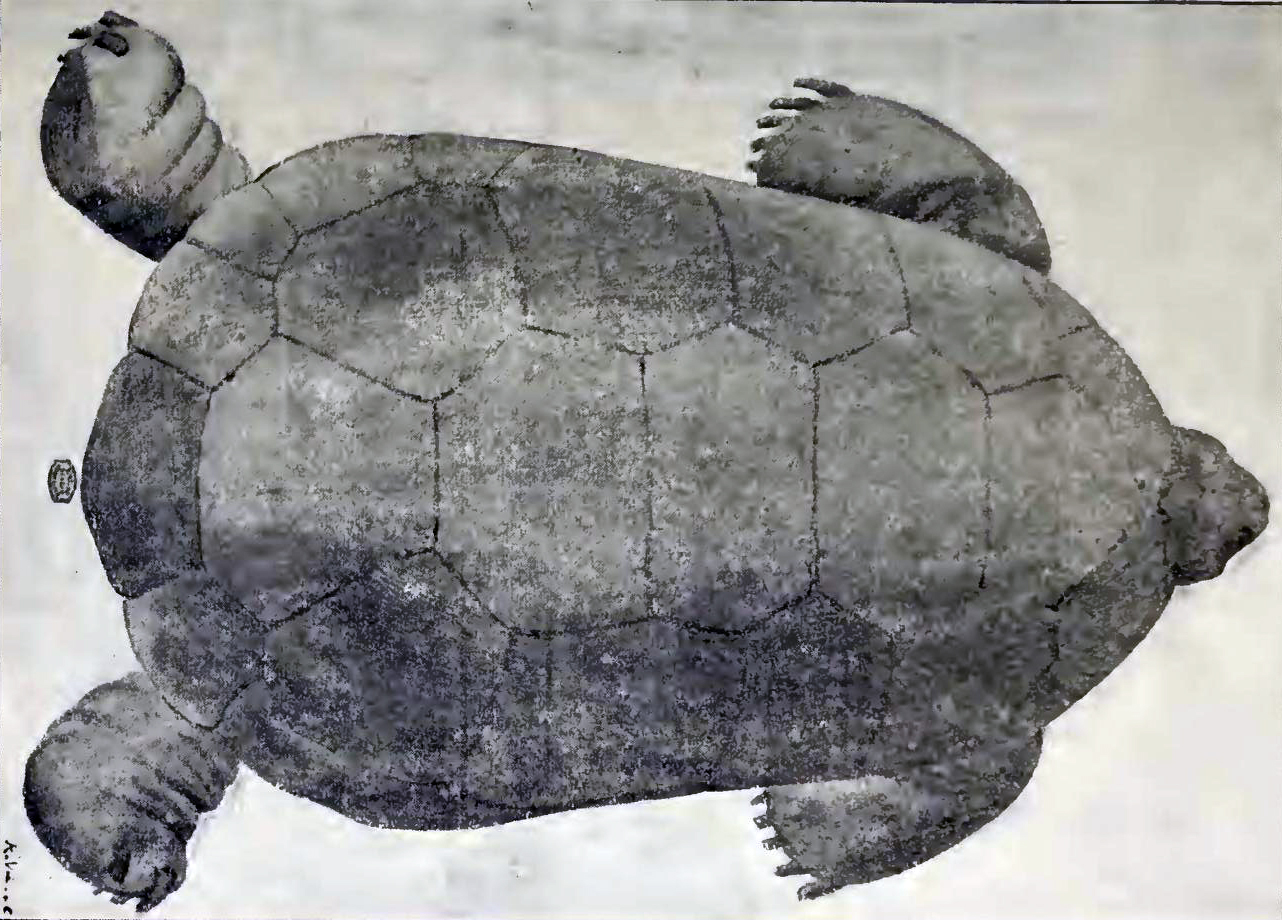
Jossigny's illustration of the upperside

The domed Rodrigues giant tortoise was one of the smallest of the giant tortoises of the Indian Ocean, reaching a length of just over 40 cm (16 in) and an estimated weight of around 12 kg (26 lb).

A low grazer of grasses, it shared Rodrigues Island with its much larger relative, the saddle-backed Rodrigues giant tortoise, which browsed the taller vegetation. Both species were descended from an ancestral species on Mauritius (an ancestor of Cylindraspis inepta), which colonised Rodrigues by sea many millions of years ago, and then differentiated into the two Rodrigues species.

== Behaviour and ecology ==
Leguat gave an account of the behaviour of the tortoises on Rodrigues in 1708:

Every one knows that these animals in general are hatch’d in eggs. The landturtles lay theirs in the sand, and cover them, that they may be hatch’d. The scale of it, or rather the shell, is soft, and the substance within good to eat. There are such plenty of land-turtles in this Isle, that sometimes you see two or three thousand of them in a flock; so that one may go above a hundred paces on their backs; or, to speak more properly on their carapaces, without setting foot to the ground. They meet together in the evening in shady places, and lie so close, that one wou’d think those places were pav’d with them.There’s one thing very odd among them; they always place sentinels at some distance from the troop, at the four corners of the camp, to which the sentinels turn their backs, and look with their eyes, as if they were on watch. This we have always observ’d of them; and this mystery seems the more difficult to be comprehended, for that these creatures are incapable to defend themselves, or to fly.

== Extinction ==
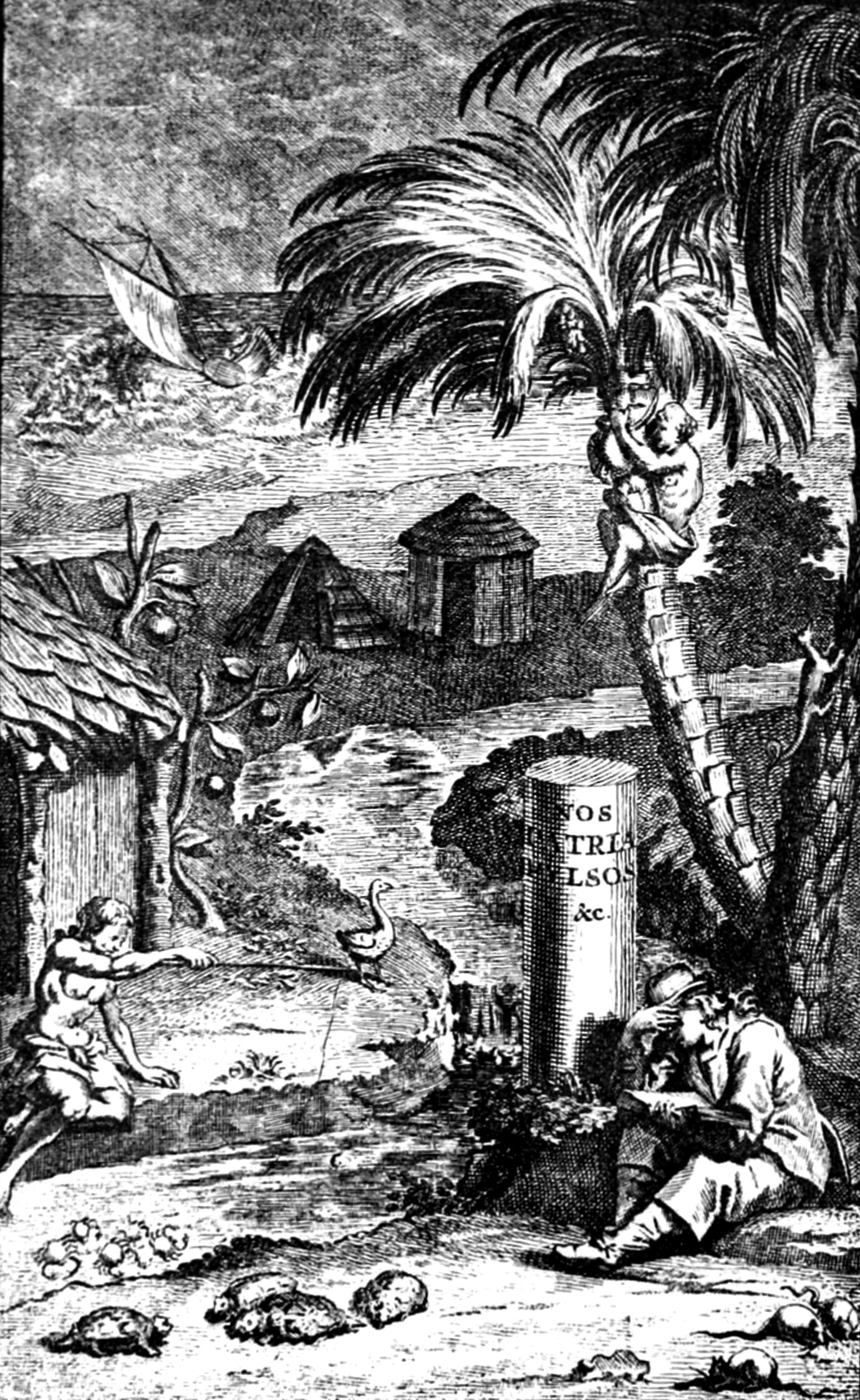
1707 illustration showing a settlement in Rodrigues, with giant tortoises, rats, crabs, a Rodrigues solitaire and a lizard on a palm trunk.

At the time of the arrival of human settlers, dense giant tortoise herds of many thousands were reported on Rodrigues. Like many island species, they were reported to have been friendly, curious, and unafraid of humans. However, in the ensuing years, massive harvesting and exporting for food, as well as the introduction of invasive species, rapidly exterminated the giant tortoises. Hundreds of thousands were loaded into ships' holds for food, or to be transported to Mauritius, where they were burnt for fat and oil.

Pingré gave an account of the human uses of Rodrigues tortoises in 1763:

The tortoise is not a pretty animal, but it was the most useful of those we found at Rodrigues. In the three and a half months that I spent on the island, we ate almost nothing else: tortoise soup, fried tortoise, stewed tortoise, tortoise in godiveau [?], tortoise eggs, tortoise liver – these were pretty much our only savouries. This meat seemed to me as good on the last day as on the first; I did not eat many of the eggs; the liver seemed to me the most delicious part of the animal. After five weeks stay I was attacked by dysentery which I kept secret, because I counted more on myself to heal it than the island’s surgeon. Diet and rest put me right in a few days, but it left me with an extraordinary involuntary repugnance for this liver that I had so liked until then. Should I thus regard it as the cause of my indisposition? Tortoise fat is very abundant and does not congeal; it is what is known as tortoise oil. This oil had no bad taste, it is very healthy, and we seasoned our salads with it, used it in frying and all our sauces. Rodrigues tortoises are a foot and a half long and about a foot across; they were formerly larger, but they are no longer given time to grow.When a bigger one is found, it is called a carrosse. These carrosses cannot harm a waking man, though they have sometimes bitten sleepers hard. The shells of these tortoises served us like baskets to carry oysters and other similar provisions. The flesh of these tortoises is the colour of mutton, and approaches it for taste.

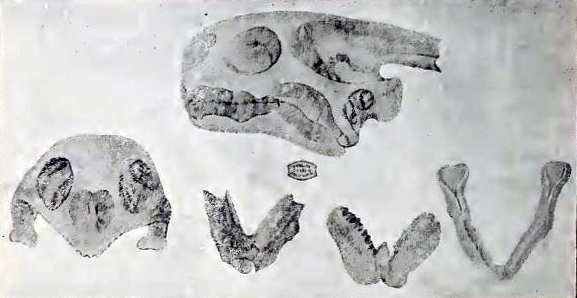
Skull and jaws by Jossigny

A surviving giant tortoise was reported on Rodrigues in 1795, at the bottom of a ravine. As late as 1802, there is mention of survivors reportedly being killed in the large fires used to clear the island's vegetation for agriculture.

It has subsequently been discovered that the browsing herds of giant tortoises filled an essential role in the island's ecosystem and the regeneration of its forests. In recognition of this fact, measures have been undertaken to introduce replacements, in the form of similar species of tortoises from other parts of the world, to assist in the rebuilding of Rodrigues' devastated environment. The replacement species for the domed Rodrigues tortoise was chosen to be the radiated tortoise (Astrochelys radiata) of Madagascar, which is similar in size and habits.
