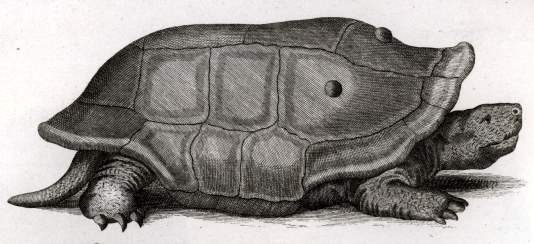
- 1792 sketch of a living specimen

Conservation status
- Extinct (around 1800) (IUCN 3.1)

Scientific classification
- Kingdom: Animalia
- Phylum: Chordata
- Class: Reptilia
- Order: Testudines
- Suborder: Cryptodira
- Family: Testudinidae
- Genus: †Cylindraspis
- Species: †C. indica

Binomial name
- †Cylindraspis indica Schneider, 1783

Synonyms
- Testudo indica Schneider, 1783; Chersine retusa Merrem, 1820; Testudo retusa Gray, 1831; Chelonura indica Rafinesque, 1832; Testudo perraultii Duméril & Bibron, 1835; Geochelone (Cylindraspis) perraultii Fitzinger, 1835; Cylindrapis indica Agassiz, 1857; Megalochelys indica Agassiz, 1857; Chersina grayi Strauch, 1865; Geochelone graii Pritchard, 1967; Geochelone indica Pritchard, 1967; Geochelone grayi Auffenberg, 1974; Testudo indica perraultii Auffenberg, 1974; Cylindraspis borbonica Bour, 1978; Cylindraspis graii Bour, 1978; Cylindraspis indica Bour, 1978; Cylindraspis bourbonica Gerlach, 2001 (ex errore)

= Réunion giant tortoise =

Extinct species of tortoise

The Reunion giant tortoise (Cylindraspis indica) is an extinct species of giant tortoise in the family Testudinidae. It was endemic to Réunion Island in the Indian Ocean.

This giant tortoise was numerous in the 17th and early 18th centuries. They were killed in vast numbers by European sailors, and finally became extinct in the 1840s.

== Description ==
The Réunion giant tortoise was 50 to 110 cm (20 to 43 in) long. It was the largest of the Cylindraspis giant tortoise species of the Mascarenes. It was roughly the same size as modern Aldabra giant and Galapagos giant tortoises, though it was a longer and more elongated animal.

It had long legs and a long neck which supported a large head with powerful, strongly-serrated jaws. The species was sexually dimorphic, in that males were noticeably larger than females.

It was also a highly variable species. A problem arises when identifying this species because it appears there were domed variants as well as saddle-backed variants.

== Distribution ==
This species was endemic to Réunion. On this island it was naturally extremely numerous, and its vast herds provided an important role in the health and rejuvenation of the indigenous forests.

=== Extinction ===
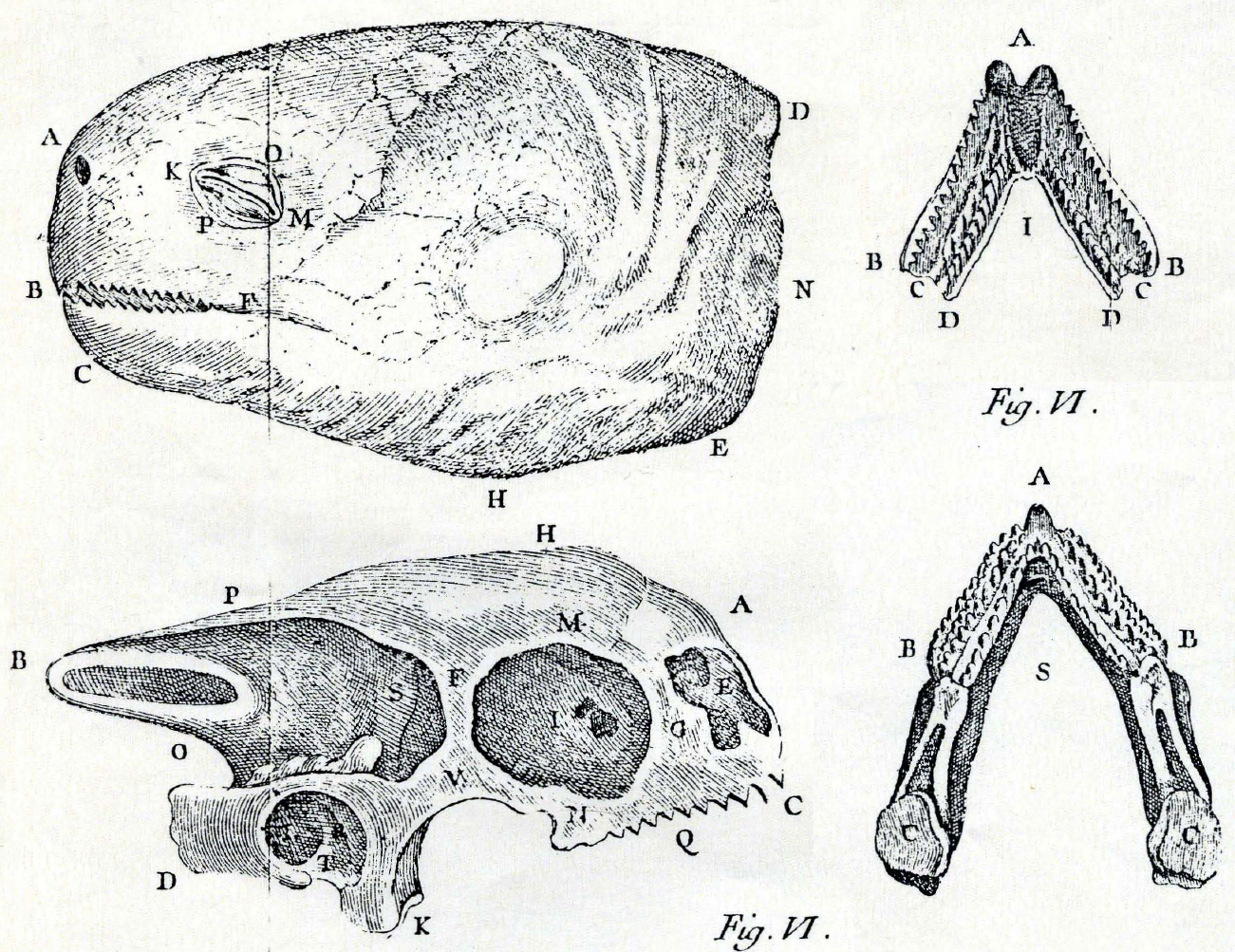
1737 illustration of the severed head and skull of a specimen

These giant tortoises were very friendly, curious, and had no fear of humans. They were, therefore, easy prey for the first inhabitants of the island, and were slaughtered in vast numbers to be burnt for fat and oil, or to be used as food (for humans or pigs). Large numbers were also stacked into the holds of passing ships, as food supplies for sea trips.

In addition, invasive species, such as pigs, cats, and rats, destroyed the eggs and hatchlings of the giant tortoises.

Coastal populations were completely decimated by the 18th century. It was presumed extinct in much of the island since 1800, with the last specimen observed in Upper Cilaos. The last few animals survived in the highlands until the 1840s.
