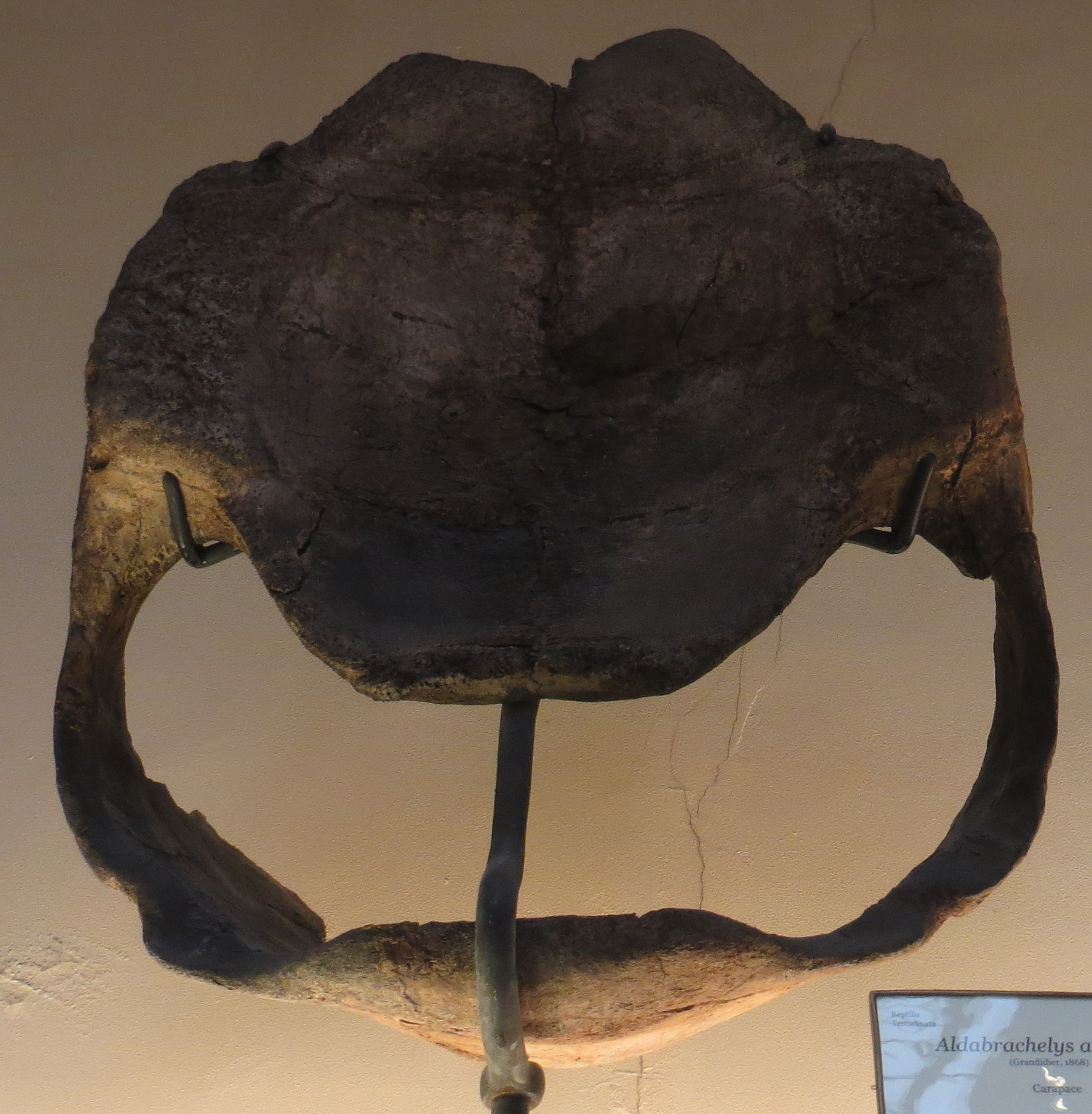
- Carapace

Scientific classification
- Kingdom: Animalia
- Phylum: Chordata
- Class: Reptilia
- Order: Testudines
- Suborder: Cryptodira
- Family: Testudinidae
- Genus: Aldabrachelys
- Species: †A. abrupta

Binomial name
- †Aldabrachelys abrupta Grandidier, 1868

Synonyms
- Testudo abrupta Milne-Edwards, 1868 (nomen nudum); Testudo abrupta Grandidier, 1868:377; Geochelone abrupta Pritchard, 1967; Asterochelys abrupta Bour, 1980; Dipsochelys abrupta Bour, 1982; Aldabrachelys abrupta Austin, Arnold & Bour, 2003

= Aldabrachelys abrupta =

Aldabrachelys abrupta Temporal range: Holocene

Extinct species of tortoise

Aldabrachelys abrupta, the abrupt giant tortoise, is an extinct species of giant tortoise that was endemic to Madagascar.

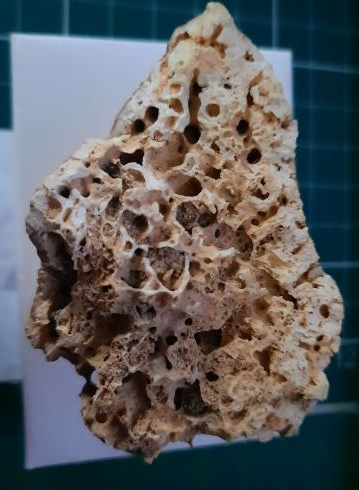
Carapace fragment

== Ecology ==
It was a large species, roughly 115 cm in length. It was originally one of the seven endemic tortoise species of Madagascar (two large Aldabrachelys; three medium Astrochelys; two small Pyxis). It was sympatric with the other giant tortoise species of Madagascar, Grandidier's giant tortoise (Aldabrachelys grandidieri (also extinct)), and both species occupied both the coasts and the cooler highlands of Madagascar, where they fulfilled the role of large grazers. A. abrupta was a browser of bushes and low-hanging branches; A. grandidieri was a grazer of grassy meadows and wetlands.

Unlike its sister species, which had a low, flattened shell, A. abrupta had a high, domed shell.

== Extinction ==
Material of this species has been dated to 750–2850 years before present (c. 830 BC - c. 1270 AD), and it seems to have been widely distributed throughout Madagascar. It was estimated to have gone extinct between c. 1200 - 1300 AD. However, remains with disputed dating have suggested that some survived up until at least 1500, and it seems to have survived a considerable time in coexistence with humans, before it finally died out.
