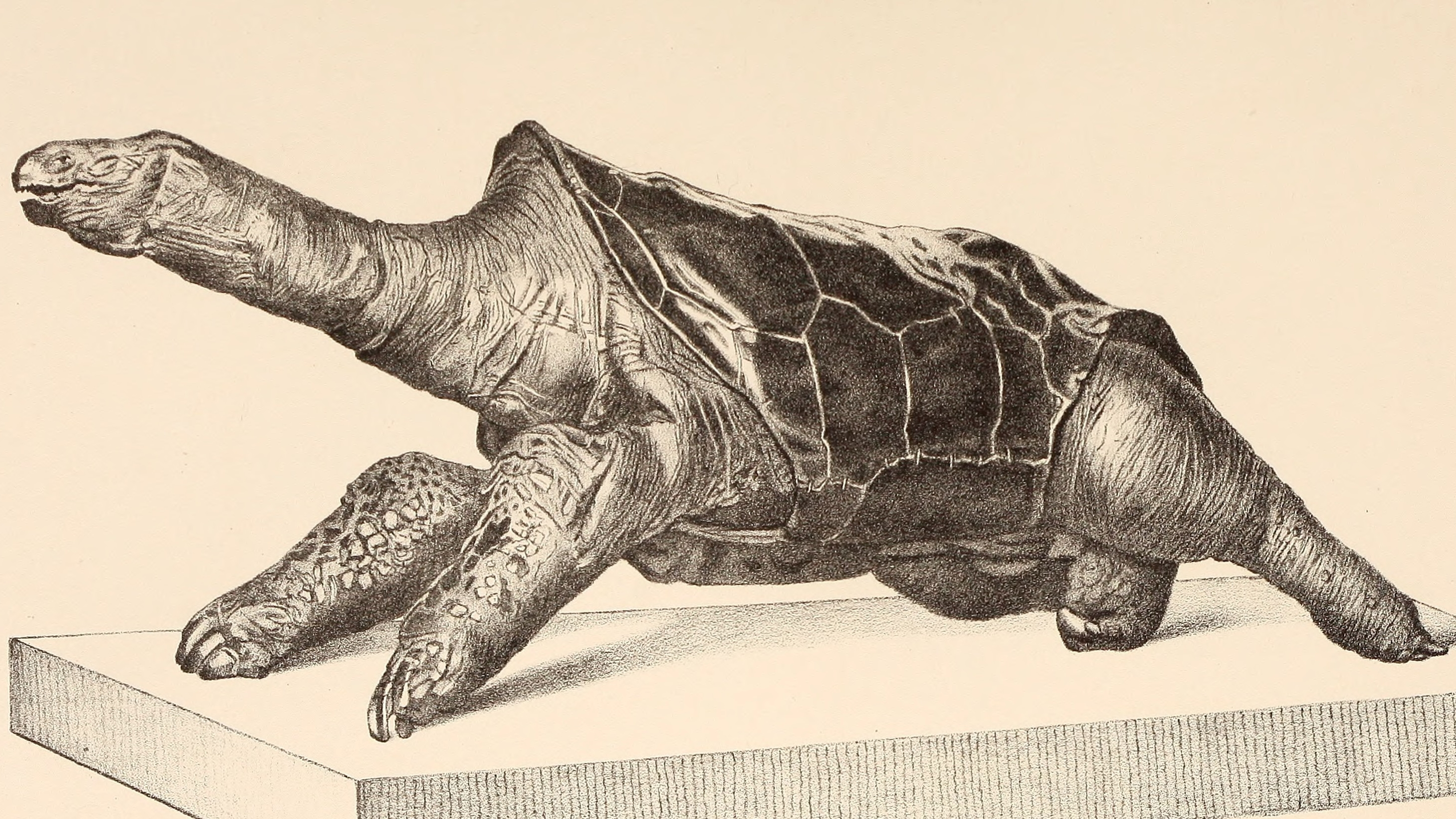
- Lithograph of a taxidermied specimen of Cylindraspis vosmaeri

Scientific classification
- Kingdom: Animalia
- Phylum: Chordata
- Class: Reptilia
- Order: Testudines
- Suborder: Cryptodira
- Family: Testudinidae
- Genus: †Cylindraspis; Fitzinger, 1835

= Cylindraspis =

Cylindraspis Temporal range: Holocene Divergence estimates suggest mid-Eocene origin

Extinct genus of tortoises

Cylindraspis is a genus of recently extinct giant tortoises. All of its species lived in the Mascarene Islands (Mauritius, Rodrigues and Réunion) in the Indian Ocean and all are now extinct due to hunting and introduction of non-native predators.

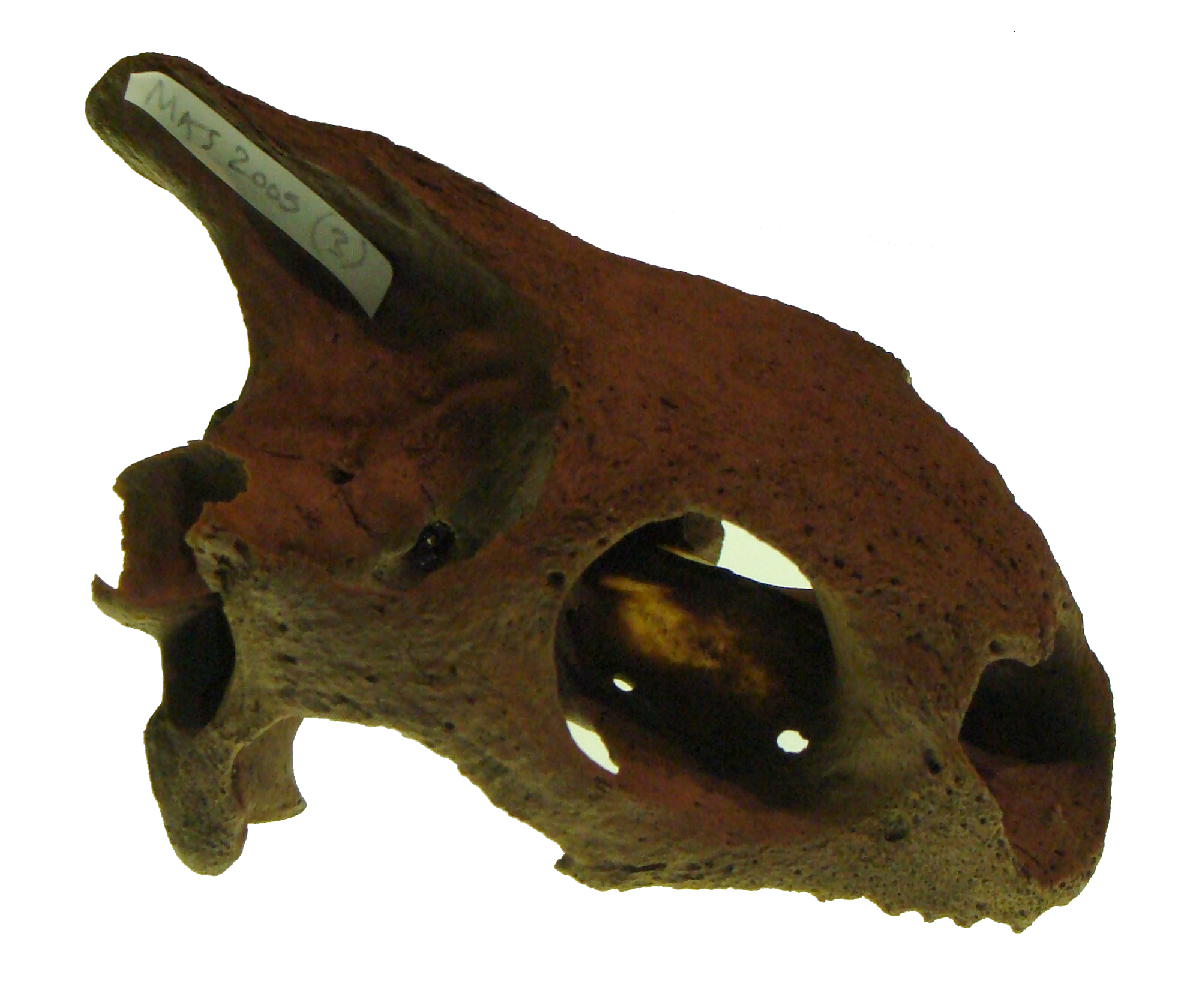
Skull

They are not closely related to any extant group of tortoises, having diverged from the largely African clade including Chelonoidis, Geochelone, and Astrochelys around 40 million years ago during the Eocene, most likely in Africa. The split between species within the genus is also deep, with the split between C. triserrata and all other members of the genus being estimated at around 28 million years ago, during the Oligocene, before the current Mascarene Islands were even formed, meaning that the genus must have colonised the Mascarenes by island hopping from now-submerged paleoislands formed by the Réunion hotspot as part of the Mascarene Plateau, including the Saya de Malha Bank and Nazareth Bank.

Human settlers colonised the Mascarenes in 1663. These giant tortoises were very large and slow, thus making them easy game. Like many island species, they were also reported to have been friendly and unafraid of humans. Most species of this genus were already driven to extinction by 1795 and the last individuals were reputed to have died around 1840 (Arnold 1979, Bour 1980, Cheke and Hume 2008).

== Species ==
The genus contains at least the following species:

- †C. indica, Réunion giant tortoise, also known by the synonym Cylindraspis borbonica, from Réunion
- †C. inepta, saddle-backed Mauritius giant tortoise, from Mauritius
- †C. peltastes, domed Rodrigues giant tortoise, from Rodrigues
- †C. triserrata, domed Mauritius giant tortoise, from Mauritius
- †C. vosmaeri, saddle-backed Rodrigues giant tortoise, from Rodrigues
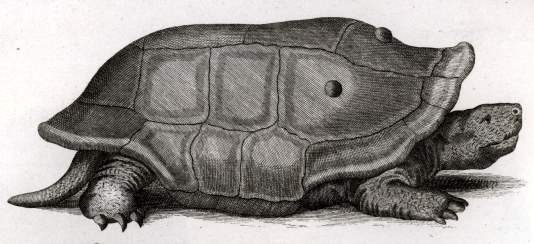
Cylindraspis indica

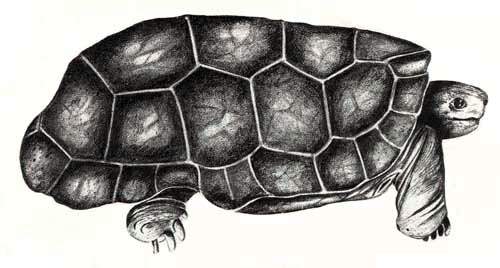
C. peltastes

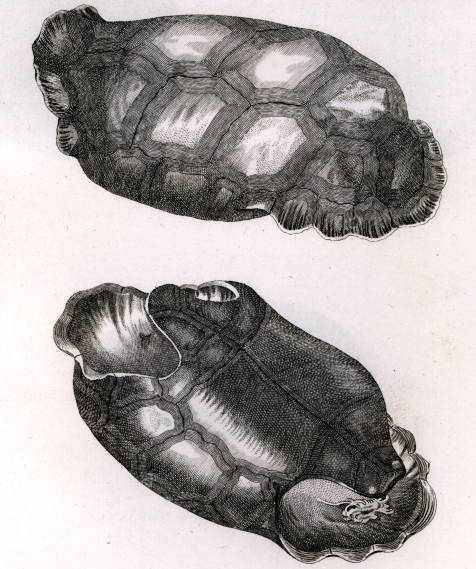
C. vosmaeri
