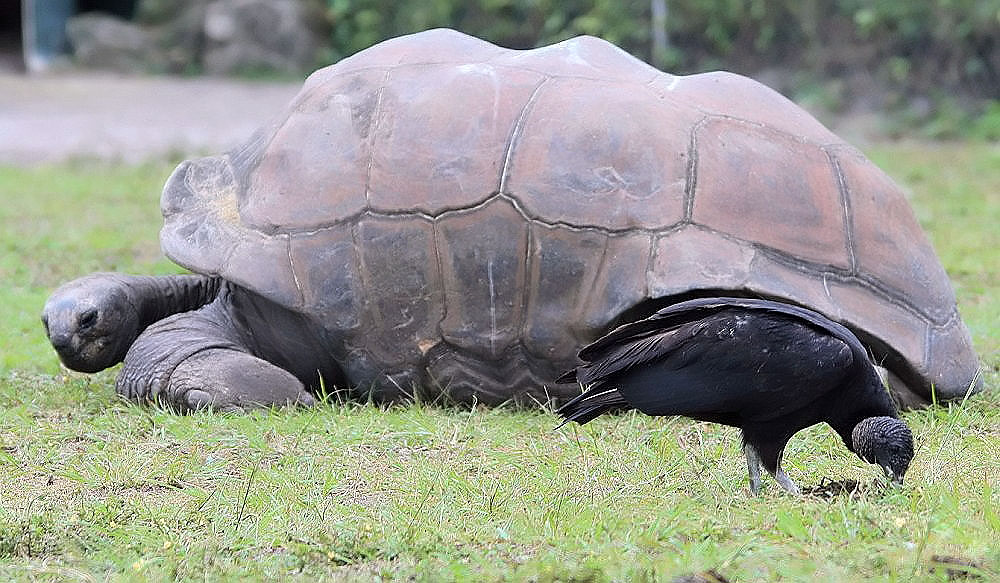
- Possible A. g. arnoldi

Scientific classification
- Kingdom: Animalia
- Phylum: Chordata
- Class: Reptilia
- Order: Testudines
- Suborder: Cryptodira
- Family: Testudinidae
- Genus: Aldabrachelys
- Species: A. gigantea
- Subspecies: A. g. arnoldi

Trinomial name
- Aldabrachelys gigantea arnoldi (Bour, 1982)

Synonyms
- Aldabrachelys gigantea arnoldi BOUR, 1982; Testudo elephantina DUMÉRIL & BIBRON, 1835 (ex errore) — DUMÉRIL 1854: 197; Testudo vosmaeri DUMÉRIL & BIBRON, 1854: 221 (?); Testudo indica SCHNEIDER, 1783 (ex errore) — GRAY 1855: 6; Testudo vosmaeri FITZINGER, 1826 (ex errore) — GRAY 1855: 6; Testudo daudinii DUMÉRIL & BIBRON, 1835 (ex errore) — GÜNTHER 1877: 33; Dipsochelys arnoldi BOUR, 1982; Dipsochelys arnoldi LÜCKER, 2000; Dipsochelys arnoldi BONIN (et al) 2006: 223 (uncertain species); Dipsochelys dussumieri arnoldi TTWG, 2010; Aldabrachelys gigantea arnoldi TTWG, 2012

= Aldabrachelys gigantea arnoldi =

Arnold's giant tortoise

Subspecies of tortoise

Arnold's giant tortoise (Aldabrachelys gigantea arnoldi), also known as the Seychelles saddle-backed giant tortoise, is a subspecies of tortoise in the genus Aldabrachelys.

It inhabited the large central granitic Seychelles islands, but was hunted in vast numbers by European sailors. By around 1840 it was presumed to be extinct, along with the Seychelles giant tortoise, a subspecies which shared the same islands.

It was recently rediscovered. Currently, less than a hundred individuals exist. Several had been reestablished in the wild on forested islands of Seychelles such as Silhouette, but were evicted in 2011 by the Seychelles Islands Development Company (IDC).

== Etymology ==
The subspecific name, arnoldi, is in honor of British herpetologist Edwin Nicholas "Nick" Arnold.

== Description ==
The three Aldabra giant tortoise subspecies can be distinguished based on carapace shape, but many captive animals may have distorted carapaces, so they may be difficult to identify.

Arnold's giant tortoise is flattened, smooth, and with a relatively high opening to the shell; it is usually black. This subspecies usually has a depression on the suture between the first and second costal scutes, this may be a shallow depression or a distinctive pit. The plastron is less variable than the carapace and usually provides a good indication of the subspecies.

== Life history ==
Giant tortoises are among the longest-lived animals on the planet. Some individual Aldabra giant tortoises are thought to be over 200 years of age, but this is difficult to verify because they tend to outlive their human observers. Adwaita was reputedly one of four brought by British seamen from the Seychelles Islands as gifts to Robert Clive of the British East India Company in the 18th century, and came to the Calcutta Zoo in 1875. At his death in March 2006 at the Kolkata (formerly Calcutta) Zoo in India, Adwaita is reputed to have reached the longest ever measured life span of 255 years (birth year 1750). Today, Jonathan, a Seychelles giant tortoise, is thought to be the oldest living giant tortoise at the age of 193 years and Esmeralda second at the age of 170 years, since the death of Harriet, a Galapagos giant tortoise, at 176. Esmeralda is an Aldabra giant tortoise.

== Morphotype ==
This is a controversial subspecies possibly distinct from the Aldabra giant tortoise. The subspecies is a distinct morphotype, but is considered synonymous with that species by many researchers. This identification is based primarily on morphological characteristics. Published molecular identifications are unclear with several different indications provided by different data sources. Captive-reared juveniles suggest that there may be a genetic basis for the morphotype and more detailed genetic work is needed to elucidate these relationships. The subspecies is the only living saddle-backed tortoise in the Seychelles. It was apparently extirpated from the wild but recently purportedly rediscovered in captivity. The current population of this morphotype is 24 adults, including 18 adult males in nonbreeding captive groups on Mahé Island. Successful captive breeding has produced numerous juveniles.

== Extinction and rediscovery ==
The Aldabra subspecies has generally been assumed to have been the only one to survive overexploitation. Occasionally, most recently in 1995, it has been suggested that some Seychelles granitic island tortoises survive in captivity. The report of oddly-shaped captive tortoises prompted the Nature Protection Trust of Seychelles (NPTS) to examine the identity of the living tortoises. Examination of museum specimens of the supposedly extinct Seychelles subspecies by Dr. Justin Gerlach and Laura Canning confirmed that some living tortoises do show characteristics of the subspecies.

Some recently published scientific papers on the genetics of the Seychelles and Indian Ocean tortoises provide conflicting results. Some studies suggest only one species was ever present in the islands, whilst others suggest three distinct, but closely related, species.

These different views derive from studies of different genes. A synthesis of all available genetic data indicates Arnold's giant tortoise is genetically the most distinctive Aldabrachelys tortoise. This fits with the ecology and morphology of the subspecies, as a highly distinctive tortoise adapted to feeding on low vegetation rather than the grazing habits of the Seychelles giant tortoise and Aldabra giant tortoise. Due to its unusual saddle-backed shape, this is the only Seychelles tortoise species that regularly basks in the sun. The other subspecies do so occasionally, but Arnold's giant tortoises rapidly lose heat from the skin of their exposed necks and need to heat up in the sun in the mornings.

=== Conservation ===
With DNA testing, tortoises of the thought to be extinct subspecies were identified and were acquired by the Nature Protection Trust of Seychelles for conservation. They were brought to Silhouette Island and the captive-breeding program was initiated in 1997. For several years, the female tortoises produced infertile eggs, but in December 2002, eggs laid by a small tortoise started to hatch. By 2006, the NPTS had produced as many babies of the Arnold's tortoises as they could cope with, which was 128. Five out of the original six adult tortoises were returned to the wild at Grande Barbe on Silhouette Island, intending to form the first wild population of this subspecies since the early 19th century but ended up being only temporary. These tortoises were visited regularly and their health and impacts on the ecosystem were monitored until NPTS was evicted from Silhouette Island. A survey in 2010 found that these tortoises were having a significant effect on the vegetation, restoring the areas where they feed into natural palm woodland. Woodland areas in 2006 were dominated by, and in 2010, regrowth of endemic palms were seen in the foreground.

The decision of the Islands Development Company to evict NPTS from Silhouette Island by March 2011 and the refusal to have wild tortoises on the island forced them to find new homes for the tortoises. The privately-managed North and Frégate islands agreed to provide a new home for the Arnold's giant tortoises. If they had been able to release them on Silhouette Island, they would have established a separate wild population, now they will be mixed with the Aldabra tortoises that are already on North and Frégate islands. NPTS have produced a new generation of many young tortoises which will live for at least 100 years. In that time, an opportunity may occur to establish pure populations of these tortoises; these animals live longer than short-term management and development perspectives.

On February 4, 2011, the first of the Arnold's giant tortoises were moved to North Island. The island subsequently decided they did not want any more tortoises and refused to take the remaining 92 tortoises. Frégate Island agreed to take them and the last of the tortoises were finally moved on June 14.
