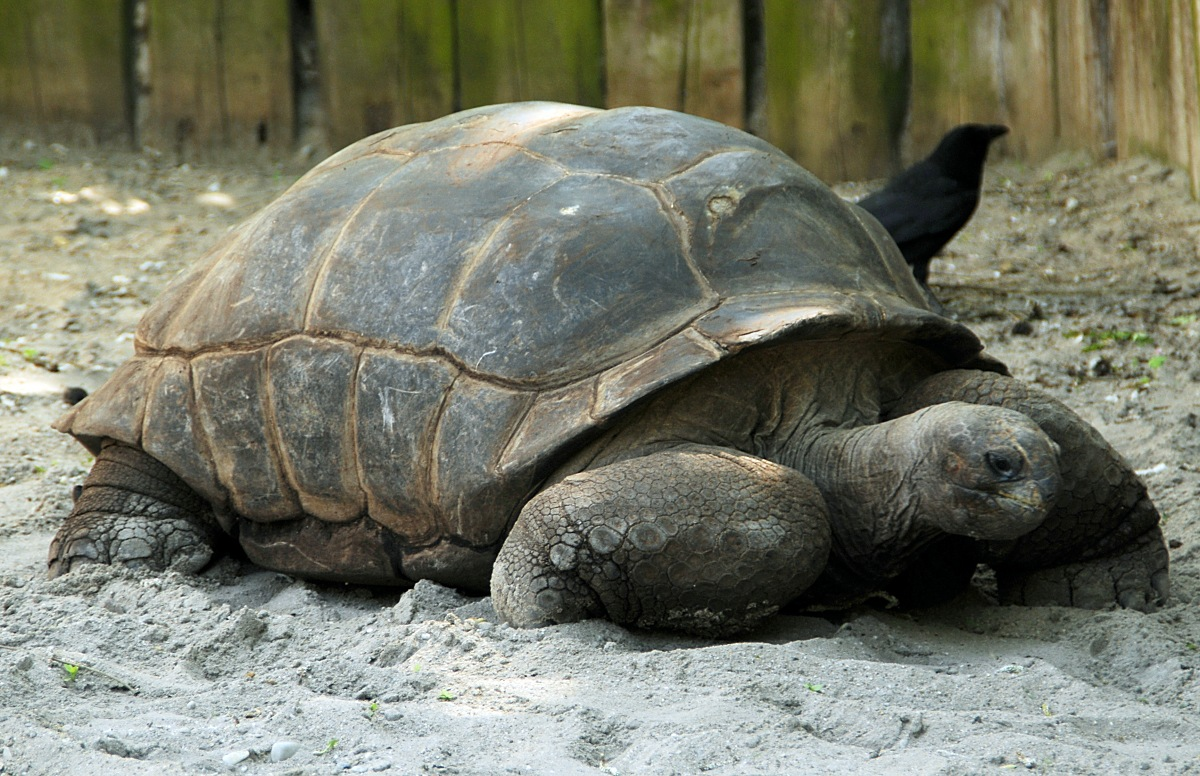

Scientific classification
- Kingdom: Animalia
- Phylum: Chordata
- Class: Reptilia
- Order: Testudines
- Suborder: Cryptodira
- Family: Testudinidae
- Genus: Aldabrachelys
- Species: A. gigantea
- Subspecies: A. g. hololissa

Trinomial name
- Aldabrachelys gigantea hololissa (Günther, 1877)

Synonyms
- List: Aldabrachelys gigantea hololissa GÜNTHER, 1877; Testudo hololissa GÜNTHER, 1875: 296 (nomen nudum); Testudo elephantina DUMÉRIL & BIBRON, 1835: 221 (ex errore) — GÜNTHER 1877: 21; Testudo hololissa GÜNTHER, 1877: 39 (part.); Testudo gigantea SCHWEIGGER, 1812 (ex errore) ROTHSCHILD 1897: 407; Testudo daudinii DUMÉRIL & BIBRON, 1835 (ex errore) ROTHSCHILD 1915: 433; Dipsochelys elephantina DUMÉRIL & BIBRON, 1835 — BOUR 1994: 85; Dipsochelys hololissa LÜCKER, 2000; Geochelone hololissa FRITZ & HAVAS, 2006; Dipsochelys hololissa BONIN, (et al) 2006; Dipsochelys dussumieri hololissa TTWG, 2010; Aldabrachelys gigantea hololissa TTWG, 2012

= Seychelles giant tortoise =

Subspecies of tortoise

The Seychelles giant tortoise (Aldabrachelys gigantea hololissa), also known as the Seychelles domed giant tortoise, is a tortoise subspecies in the genus Aldabrachelys.

It inhabited the large central granitic Seychelles islands, but was hunted in vast numbers by European sailors. By around 1840 it was presumed to be extinct, along with the Arnold's giant tortoise, a subspecies which shared the same islands.

It was recently rediscovered. Currently, a little over a hundred individuals exist. Many had been reestablished in the wild on forested islands such as Silhouette, but were evicted in 2011 by the Seychelles Islands Development Company.

== Description ==
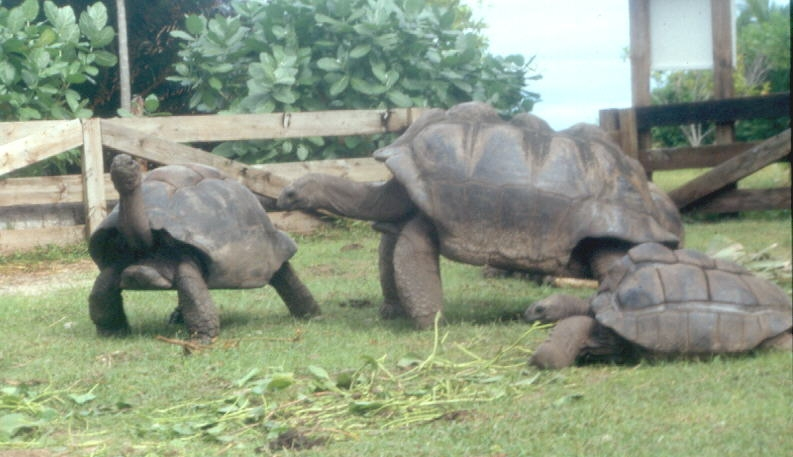
Living adult specimens

The three Aldabra-Seychelles giant tortoise subspecies can be distinguished based on carapace shape, however, many captive animals may have distorted carapaces and so may be difficult to identify.

The Seychelles giant tortoise (A. g. hololissa) is broad, flattened on the back and with raised scutes; it is usually a brownish-grey color. In comparison, the true Aldabra giant tortoise (A. g. gigantea) is a roundly-domed, black-colored subspecies.

=== Diet ===
Like other species of tortoise, the Seychelles giant tortoise is not strictly herbivorous. There have been anecdotal reports of tortoises consuming birds, crabs, and bones. In 2021, a female tortoise on Frégate Island was recorded deliberately hunting, killing, and eating a noddy tern chick.

== Lifespan ==
Giant tortoises are among the longest-lived animals on the planet. Some individual Aldabra giant tortoises are thought to be over 200 years of age, but this is difficult to verify because they tend to outlive their human observers. Adwaita was reputedly one of four brought by British seamen from the Seychelles Islands as gifts to Robert Clive of the British East India Company in the 18th century, and came to Kolkata Zoo in 1875. At his death in March 2006 at the Kolkata (formerly Calcutta) Zoo in India, Adwaita is reputed to have reached the longest ever measured life span of 255 years (birth year 1750). As of 2026, Jonathan, a 194-year-old, Saint Helena-dwelling Seychelles giant tortoise, is thought to be the oldest living terrestrial animal on Earth since the 2006 death of Harriet; a 176 year old Galapagos giant tortoise who lived at Australia Zoo. Coming in second to Jonathan is Esmeralda, at 182 years old. Esmeralda is an Aldabra giant tortoise living in the Galapagos Islands.

== Morphotype ==
This is a controversial subspecies possibly distinct from the Aldabra giant tortoise. The species is a morphologically distinctive morphotype, but is considered by many researchers to be either synonymous with or only subspecifically distinct from that taxon. This identification is based primarily on morphological characters. Published molecular identifications are unclear with several different indications provided by different data sources.

It is a domed grazing subspecies, differing from the Aldabra tortoise in its broader shape and reduced ossification of the skeleton; it differs also from the other controversial giant tortoise in the Seychelles, the saddle-backed morphotype (Arnold's giant tortoise).

It was apparently extirpated from the wild but is now known only from 37 adults, including 28 captive, and 8 on Cousine Island, 6 of which were released in 2011 along with 40 captive-bred juveniles. Captive-reared juveniles show that there is a presumed genetic basis to the morphotype and further genetic work is needed to elucidate this.

== Extinction and rediscovery ==
Originally, several different subspecies of giant tortoise inhabited the Seychelles. Large and slow, the tortoises were reportedly friendly, with little fear of humans. Sailors and settlers slaughtered thousands and swiftly drove most populations to extinction.

Though it was generally assumed that the Aldabra giant tortoise was the only one to have survived over-exploitation in the Seychelles, it has been occasionally suggested, most recently in 1995, that some Seychelles granitic island tortoises survived in captivity. The report of oddly shaped captive tortoises prompted the Nature Protection Trust of Seychelles to examine the identity of the living tortoises. Examination of museum specimens of the "extinct" Seychelles subspecies by Dr. Justin Gerlach and Laura Canning confirmed that some living tortoises exhibited characteristics of the supposedly extinct subspecies.

Some recently published scientific papers on the genetics of the Seychelles and Indian Ocean tortoises provide conflicting results. Some suggest that only one species, with multiple variants, was ever present in the islands, whilst others suggest that there were three distinct, but closely related, species. The different views derive from studies of different genes.

=== Conservation ===
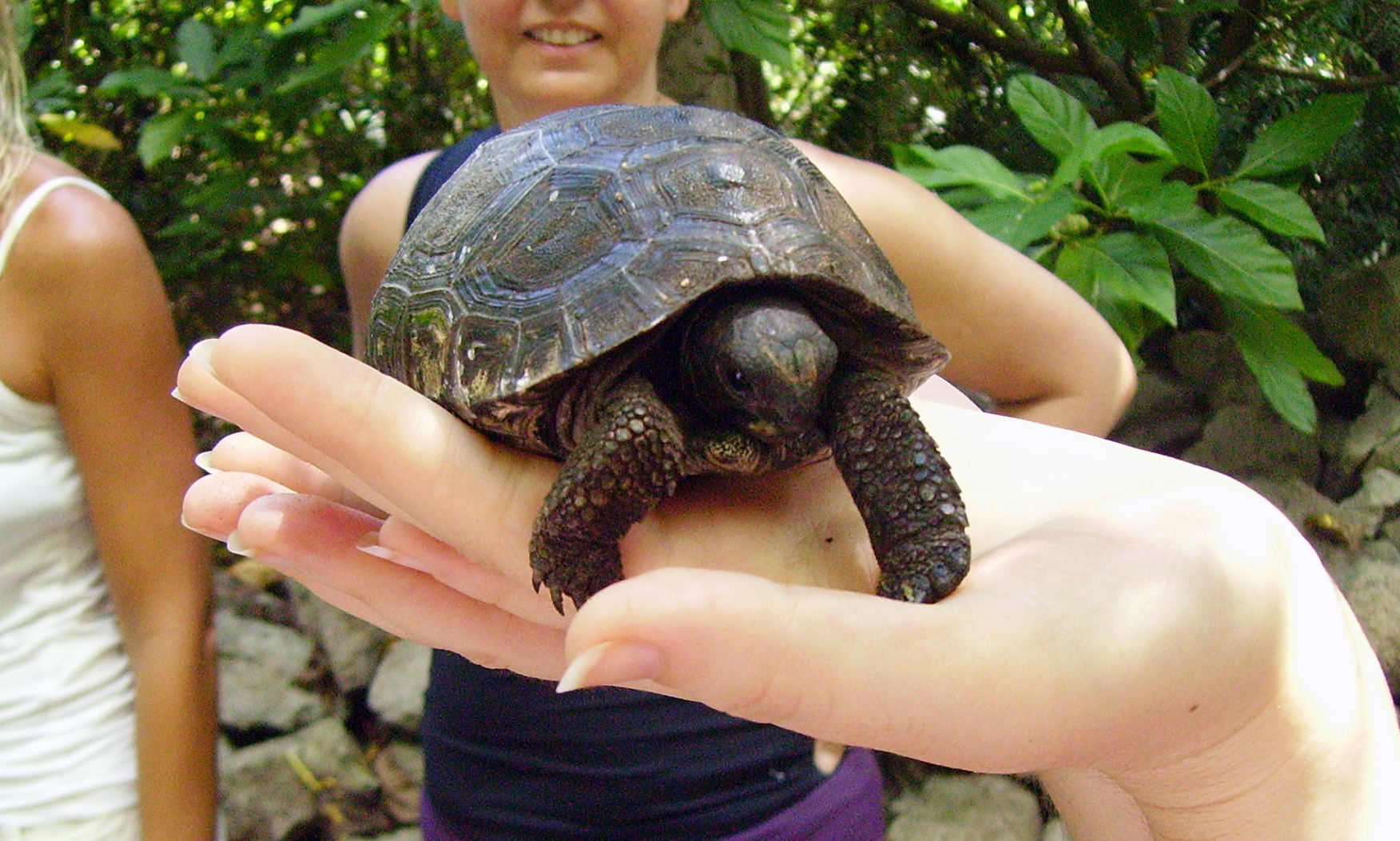
A baby, representing the possibility of re-establishing the subspecies

With DNA testing, tortoises of the "extinct" subspecies were identified and acquired by the Nature Protection Trust of Seychelles for conservation. They were brought to Silhouette Island and a captive-breeding program was initiated in 1997. For several years, the female tortoises produced infertile eggs. In November 2002, eggs laid by a young female started to hatch. By the time the Nature Protection Trust of Seychelles was evicted, it had produced 40 juveniles of the Seychelles giant tortoise.

The decision of the Islands Development Company to evict the Nature Protection Trust of Seychelles from Silhouette island by March 2011, and its refusal to permit wild tortoises to live on the island, forced the trust to remove and find new homes for the tortoises.

The privately managed island of Cousine agreed to provide a new home for the Seychelles tortoises. In April 2011, the Seychelles giant tortoises went to Cousine. If had been possible to release them on Silhouette island, they would have established a separate wild population, but now they will be mixed with the Aldabra tortoises that are already on Cousine island. The Nature Protection Trust of Seychelles took consolation from the fact that it could produce a new generation of young tortoises which will live for at least 100 years. In that time, there may be an opportunity to establish pure populations of the tortoises. The animals live longer than short-term management and development plans can provide for.
