= Plantation House, Saint Helena =

Official residence of the governor of Saint Helena

Coordinates: 15.9555°S 5.7208°W

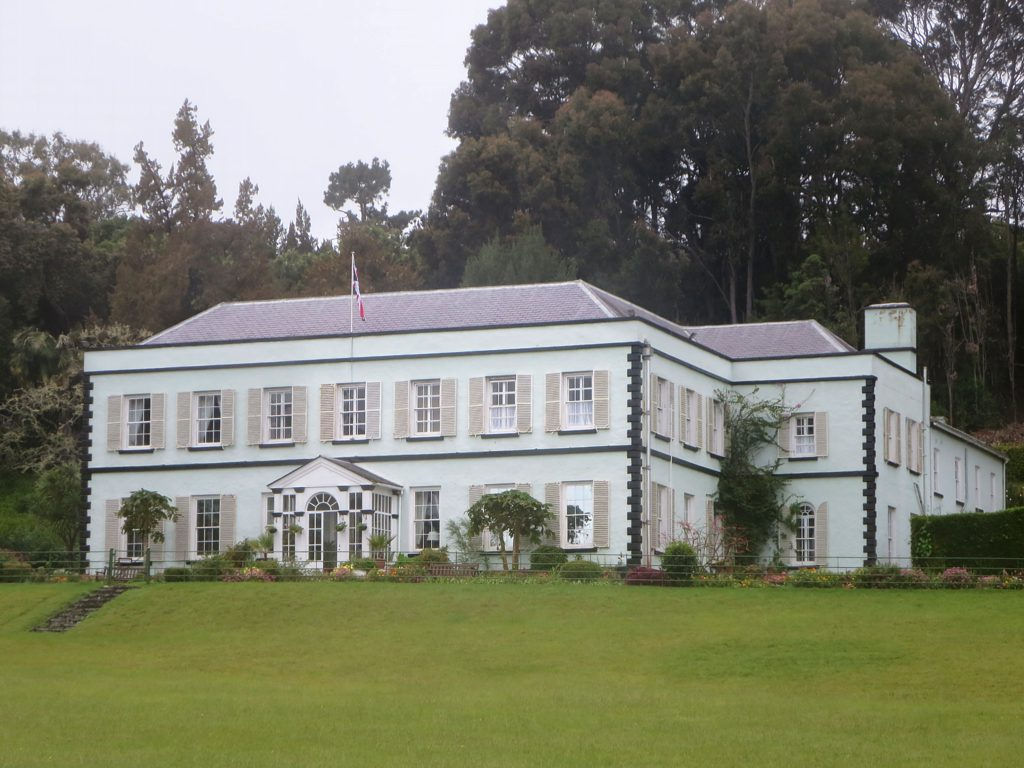
Plantation House

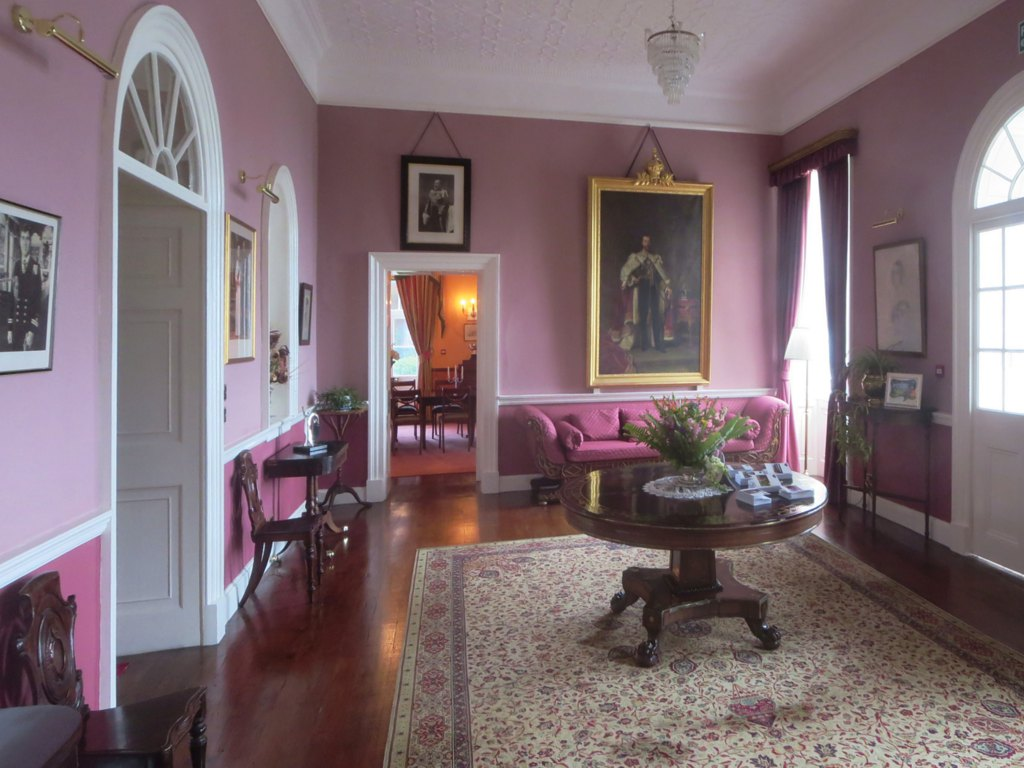
Reception Room

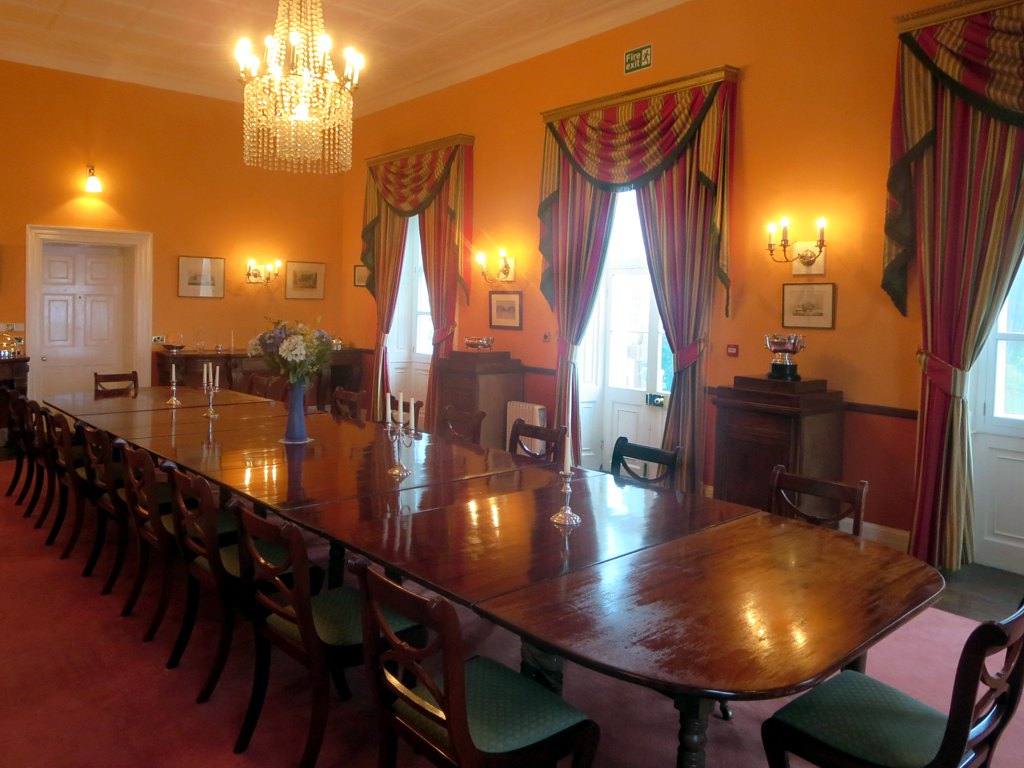
Formal Dining Room

Plantation House is the official residence of the governor of Saint Helena. It is located 3.6 km (2.2 mi) to the south of the capital, Jamestown, on the island of Saint Helena.

== History ==
The house was built 1791-2 by the East India Company, as a "country" or summer residence for the governor. The company governed the island until 1834, when it became a crown colony, although governors of the island have continued to use the property since. Administration of the island is generally carried out from Jamestown, notably at The Castle (historically the governor's residence which then became the "town" residence). An explanation for the location of the governor's official residence is the less arid climate and terrain found further inland, compared to in James Valley. The (summer) residence of the lieutenant governor was Longwood House, also inland from Jamestown.

The house was extended most dramatically in 1816 and considerable alterations, mostly external, were made in 1960. The roof was originally slate but, like with most buildings on the island, this has been replaced with metal sheeting. It is designated as a Grade I listed building. Tours of the state rooms are available by appointment.

== Tortoises ==
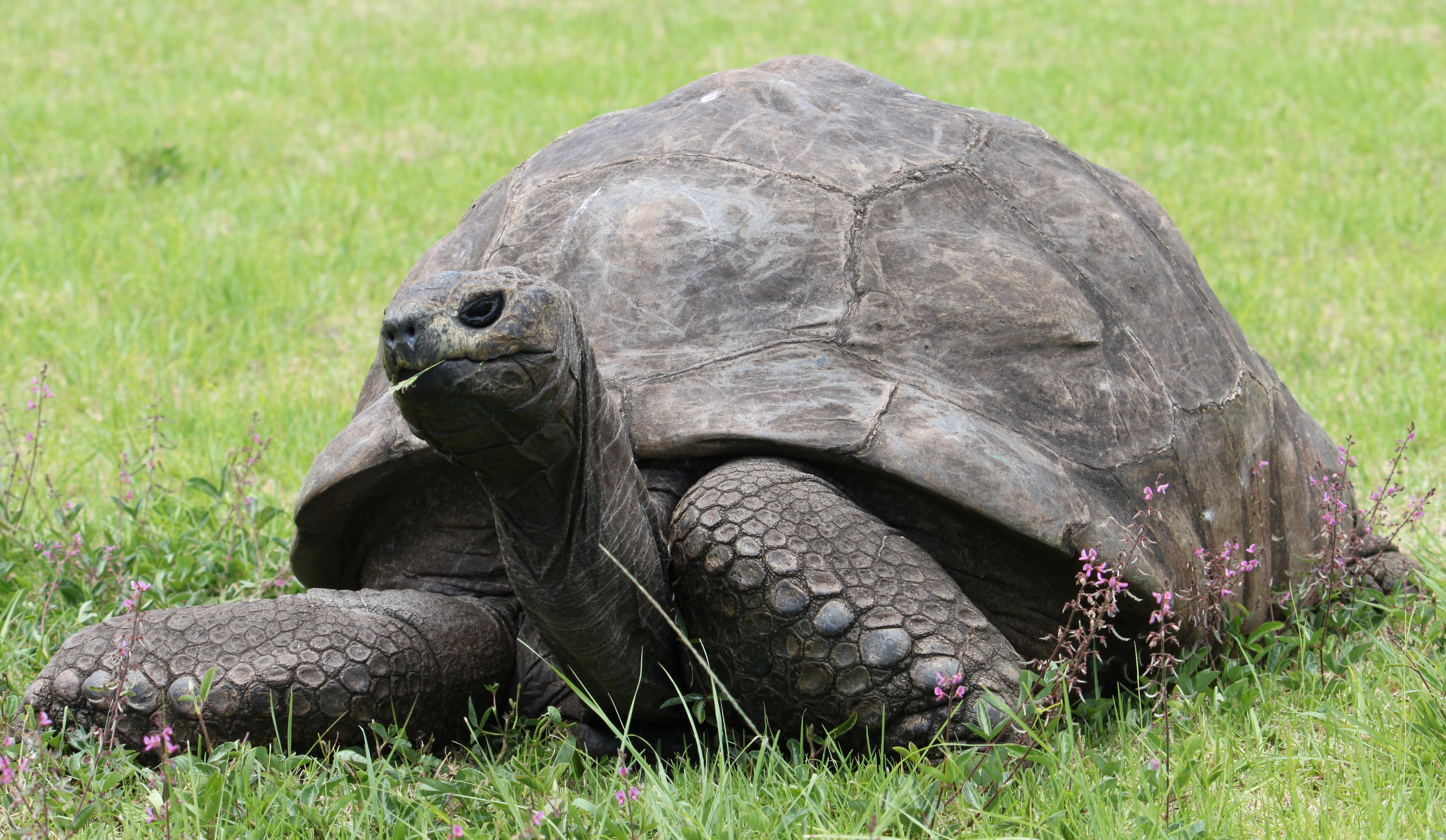
Jonathan in 2020

The grounds of Plantation House are home to four giant tortoises owned by the Saint Helena government. The most notable resident is Jonathan, a Seychelles giant tortoise who arrived on the island in 1882 and is believed to have hatched around 1832. Jonathan is recognised by the Guinness World Records as the oldest verified living land animal and the oldest chelonian in recorded history. He shares the paddock with three other giant tortoises named David, Emma, and Fred.

== Neighbourhood ==
The house is situated in the district of St Paul's and nearby is St Paul's Cathedral, also a Grade I listed building.
