= Spencer Davis (governor) =

Governor of St Helena from 1932 to 1937

Sir Spencer Davis CMG

Governor of Saint Helena
- In office 1932–1937
- Preceded by: Charles Harper
- Succeeded by: Guy Pilling

Personal details
- Born: Steuart Spencer Davis; 1875
- Died: 3 April 1950 (aged 74–75)

Sir Steuart Spencer Davis, CMG (1875 – 3 April 1950) was a British colonial administrator. He was Governor of Saint Helena from 1932 to 1937.

Davis was educated at Dean Close School, Cheltenham. After being called to the English bar by Gray's Inn in 1905, Davis served in St Kitts, the Gold Coast, Tanganyika, and Palestine before becoming Governor of Saint Helena in 1932. As governor, he named Jonathan the tortoise, currently the oldest known living land animal.
