= Harriet (tortoise) =

Tortoise from the Galápagos Islands (1830–2006)

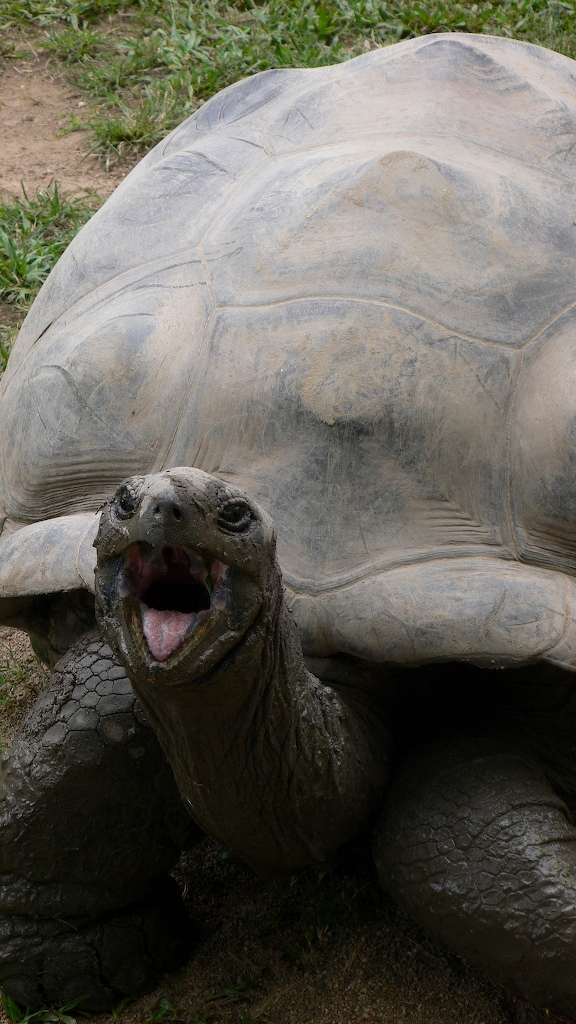
- Harriet at the Australia Zoo, 2006
- Species: Galápagos tortoise
- Sex: Female
- Hatched: c. 1830; Santa Cruz, Galápagos Islands
- Died: 23 June 2006 (aged 175–176); Beerwah, Queensland, Australia
- Known for: Collected by Charles Darwin
- Residence: Australia Zoo

Harriet (formerly Harry; c. 1830 – 23 June 2006) was a Galápagos tortoise (Chelonoidis niger, specifically a western Santa Cruz tortoise C. n. porteri) who had an estimated age of 175 years at the time of her death in Australia. At the time of her death, she lived at the Australia Zoo which was owned by Steve and Terri Irwin. Harriet is one of the longest-lived known tortoises, behind Tu'i Malila, who died in 1966 at the age of 188 or 189; Jonathan, who is currently still alive at an estimated 194 years old, and possibly Adwaita, who died in 2006 at an estimated age of between 250 and 255 years.

It is claimed that Harriet was collected by Charles Darwin during his 1835 visit to the Galápagos Islands as part of his round-the-world survey expedition, transported to England, and then taken to her final home, Australia, by John Clements Wickham, the retiring captain of the Beagle. However, doubt is cast on this story by the fact that Darwin had never visited Santa Cruz, the island that Harriet originally came from.

== HMS Beagle ==
In August 1994, a historian from Mareeba, Ed Loveday, published a letter in the local newspaper about two tortoises he remembered at the Botanic Gardens in 1922 and that the keepers of the time were saying that the tortoises had arrived at the Gardens in 1860 as a donation from John Clements Wickham, who was the first lieutenant (and later captain) of HMS Beagle under Fitzroy during the voyage of the Beagle in 1835.

Wickham actually brought three tortoises (named Tom, Dick and Harry) to Australia when he arrived after retiring from the Royal Navy in 1841; these lived at Newstead House from 1841 to 1860. Records show that the tortoises were donated to the Botanic Gardens in 1860 when Wickham retired as Government Resident of Moreton Bay (now Brisbane) and left Australia for Paris.

Some researchers claim that Wickham was in Australia in 1841 and did not visit England that year to pick up the tortoises. This differs from information published by Dr. C.G. Drury Clarke and others, who list him as being in England in 1841. Furthermore, the British Hydrographic Department published maps of Wickham's surveys in 1841, indicating that he was in London that year. In addition, John Lort Stokes, who assumed command of Beagle after Wickham, explicitly states in his book Discoveries in Australia, Volume 2 that Wickham departed to England after resigning his position as captain.

There is evidence from letters that Charles Darwin was aware that Wickham had these tortoises, as he sent a letter to Huxley in 1860 informing him that he should speak with Wickham in Paris about the last of the tortoises from the 1835 expedition because he had them. This makes it at least possible that the three tortoises at the Brisbane Botanic Gardens were personally collected by Darwin.

It is thought that as many as 40 tortoises were stowed aboard Beagle. Some were slaughtered for food, others were kept as souvenirs by crew members, a few as scientific specimens. Once Beagle returned to England, the care of these large creatures became burdensome, so they were adopted by a local museum. There is no evidence that Darwin kept any of them as a pet in his home.

== Harriet's species ==
Darwin definitely collected tortoises on San Cristobal, San Salvador, and Santa Maria; however, the species on Santa Maria (C. n. niger) was already nearing extinction when Darwin visited the islands, having been killed and eaten by prisoners on the prison colony there. The tortoises he collected there had been taken by the prisoners from other islands for food, and Darwin collected some of them before they could be eaten. Hence they were a mixture of subspecies from a number of islands. Harriet, as a C. n. porteri, is from Santa Cruz. One of the other tortoises (Tom) is still in the Queensland Museum and has been identified as a C. n. chathamensis (from San Cristobal).

== Other theories ==
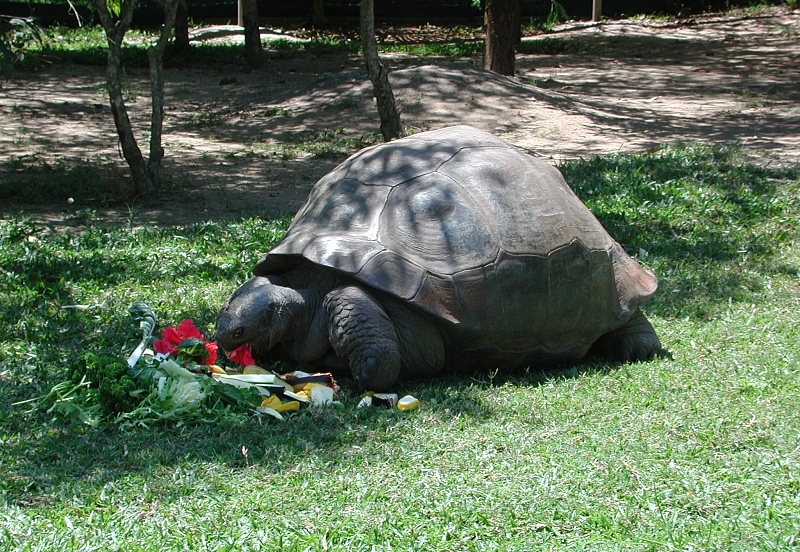
Harriet, 2002

An initial analysis of Harriet's DNA was unable to identify her subspecies in a cross section of 900 animals representing 26 extant and extinct populations. After reanalysis she was assigned to C. n. porteri. However, her genetic diversity and other factors in her DNA sequence data indicated she was most likely at least two generations removed from the oldest specimens of her species in the dataset. The oldest C. n. porteri in the dataset were collected as adults in 1907 and, hence, this would require Harriet to be hatched by 1860.

This dating rules out many alternative possibilities for Harriet as, prior to 1900, Australia was a very difficult place to get to. There were only two imports of Galápagos tortoises prior to 1900, and four of the five animals involved have been accounted for and are still represented by museum material. The suggestion in some quarters that Harriet was collected by whalers and brought to Australia is not likely, as Australia had its own whaling industry and whaling ships from South America did not visit Australia.

The tortoises collected by Darwin were all recorded in Fitzroy's journals of the voyage, including their measurements. As they averaged 11 inches (280 mm) in length, and this represented an approximate age of 5 years for the species, Harriet's year of birth was estimated by Scott Thomson to 1830, with a margin of error of two years, in the 1995 paper describing the events of Harriet's life and the results of the research.

Some also believe that Harriet was left with the Yabsley family of Coraki who were also on the Beagle.

== Later life ==
In 1874, Harriet who "had been in the Botanic Garden 50 years" was reported to have been regularly burying herself during the summer months.

In 1934 in the City Botanic Gardens, Harriet kicked and injured a man who prodded her with his finger. She was described "as entering on its second 100 years of life".

Harriet was thought to be male for many years and was actually named Harry after Harry Oakman, the creator of the zoo at the Brisbane Botanic Gardens, but this was corrected in the 1960s by a visiting director of Hawaii's Honolulu Zoo (as it happens, Tom, the specimen in the Queensland Museum, was also a female).

On 15 November 2005, her much-publicised 175th birthday was celebrated at Australia Zoo. This event was attended by Scott Thomson (the researcher on Harriet's history), three generations of the Fleay family, Robin Stewart (author of Darwin's Tortoise), and many hundreds of others who knew this tortoise during the latter part of her life.

Harriet died in her enclosure on 23 June 2006 of heart failure following a short illness.

== In popular culture ==
Harriet's story was told in Robin Stewart's book Darwin's Tortoise: The Amazing True Story of Harriet, the World's Oldest Living Creature. She appears as one of the protagonists in the Curious Science Quest series of children's time-travel adventures co-written by Julia Golding which explore the history of science. Saturday Night Live's "Emma Stone/Noah Kahan" (2023) episode included a skit titled "Question Quest", in which Harriet was the answer to the question, "What do Charles Darwin and Steve Irwin have in common?".

== See also ==
- Tu'i Malila
- Adwaita
- Jonathan (tortoise)
- List of long-living organisms
- Alagba
- Baba (tortoise)
