= Saint Paul's, Saint Helena =

Coordinates: 15°57′5″S 5°43′21″W

Saint Paul's
- Saint Paul's in Saint Helena
- Sovereign state: United Kingdom
- British overseas territory: Saint Helena, Ascension and Tristan da Cunha
- Island: Saint Helena
- Status: District

Area
  - Total: 4.4 sq mi (11.4 km^{2})

Population (2016)
  - Total: 842 (district)
  - Density: 181/sq mi (69.7/km^{2})
- Time zone: UTC+0 (GMT)

St. Paul's is one of eight districts of the island of Saint Helena, part of the British Overseas Territory of Saint Helena, Ascension and Tristan da Cunha in the South Atlantic Ocean. It is the second-most heavily populated district on the island and is located on its northwestern coast.

== Description ==
Terrain in the district is quite varied, with steep ridges and a limited amount of flat ground, as befits the island's volcanic origin. It is mainly rural and lacks any main settlement, as there are many small villages dispersed throughout. Its population has fluctuated from 795 in 1998 to 908 in 2008 and 843 in 2016. It trails only Half Tree Hollow District in size.

The district is named after the Anglican St Paul's Cathedral, which is located there, and also within the district is Plantation House, the Governor's official residence. The island's only secondary school is situated in St Paul's — the Prince Andrew School.

== History ==
When the Dutch East India Company occupied St Helena in December 1672, they made their first landing attempt at Lemon Valley Bay, but were beaten off with boulders and rocks thrown by the defenders from the heights on the sides of the valley. After the English recaptured it in May 1673, the mouth of the Lemon Valley was quickly fortified to better deter any future attempts. By 1717 the fort there was ruinous, and a quarantine station was built further up the valley to house the slaves recently received from Madagascar that had smallpox. The fortifications in Lemon Valley were allowed to continue to deteriorate until they were replaced by entirely new buildings 50-odd years later.

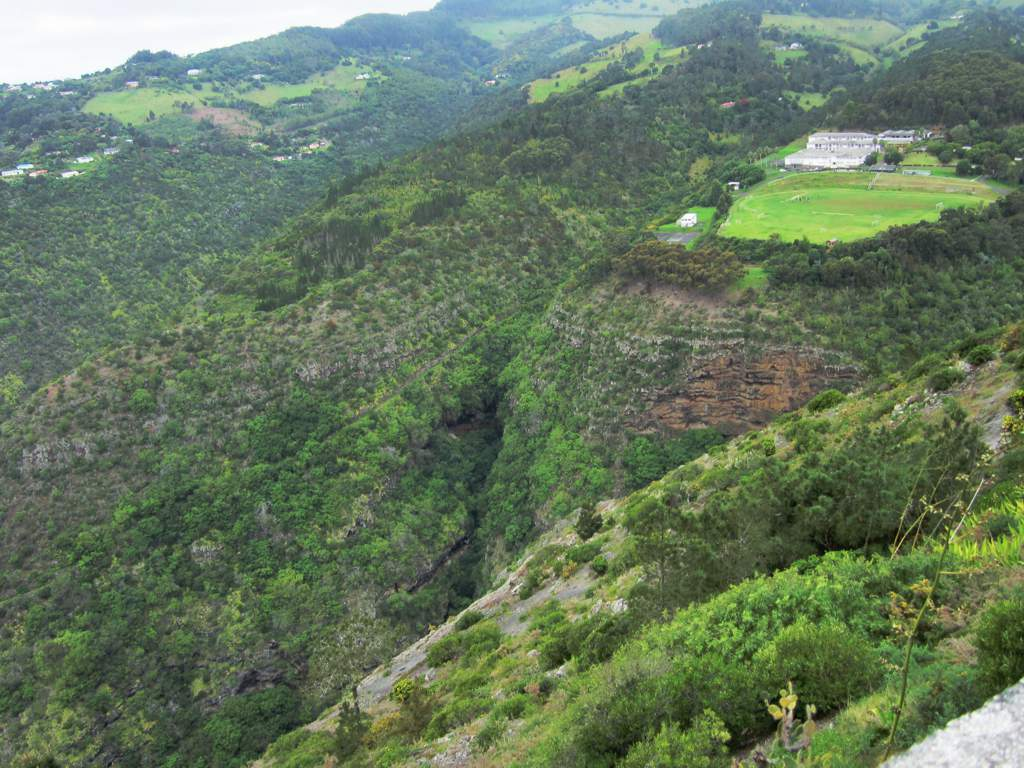
Francis Plain

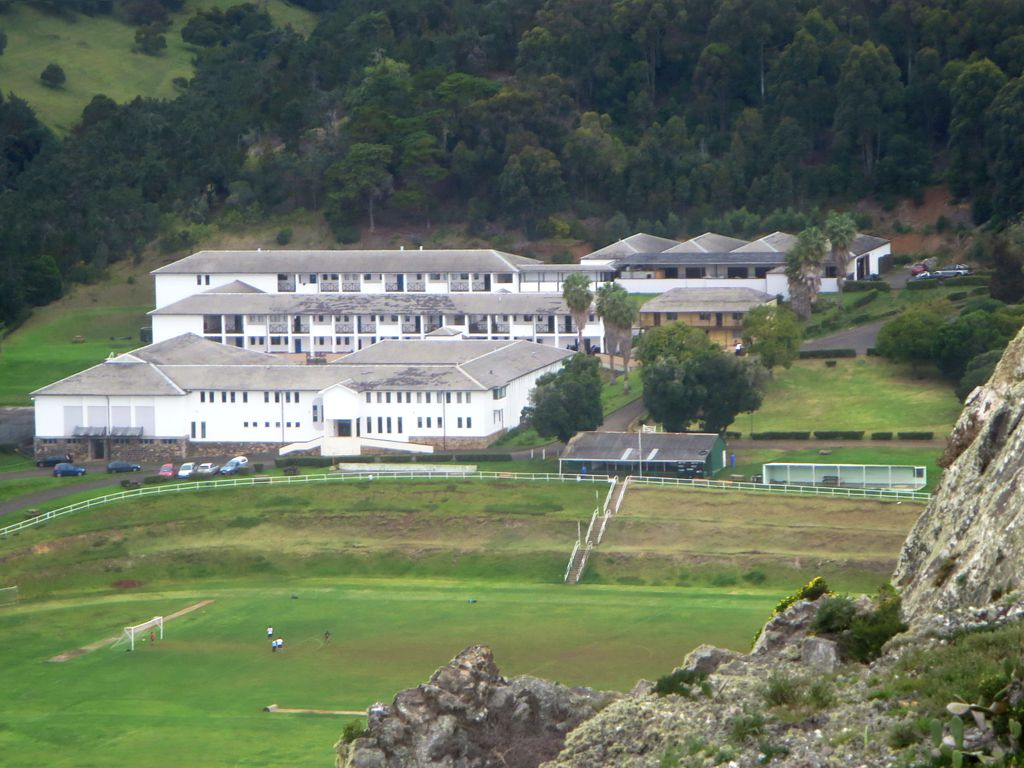
Prince Andrew School

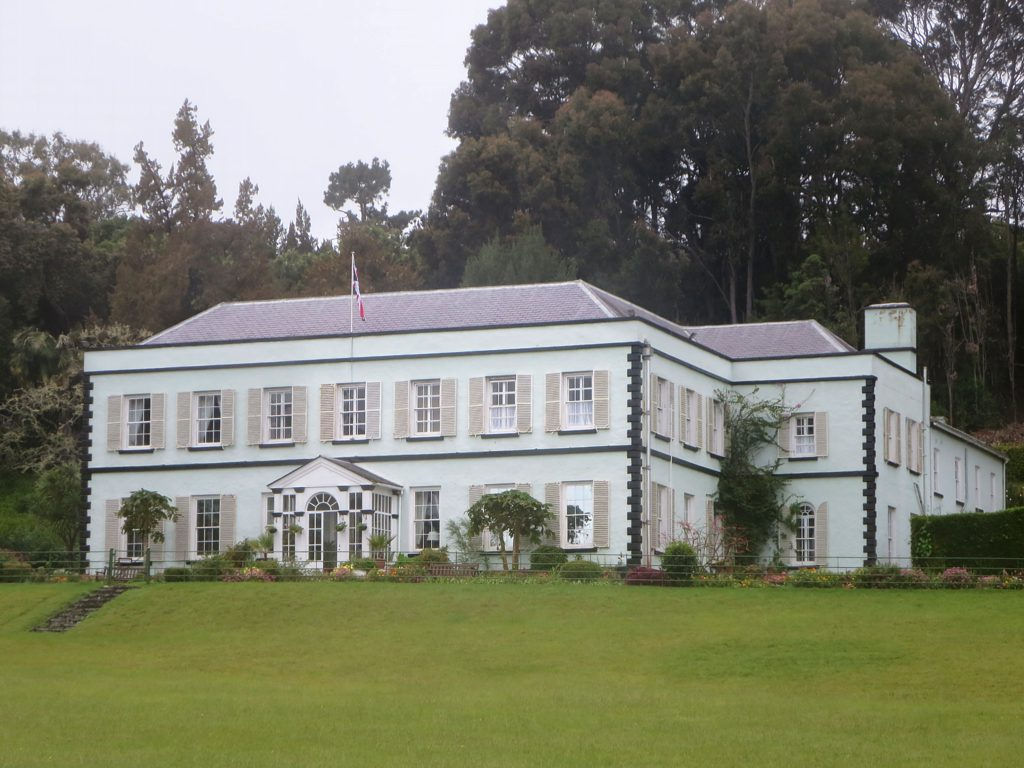
Plantation House

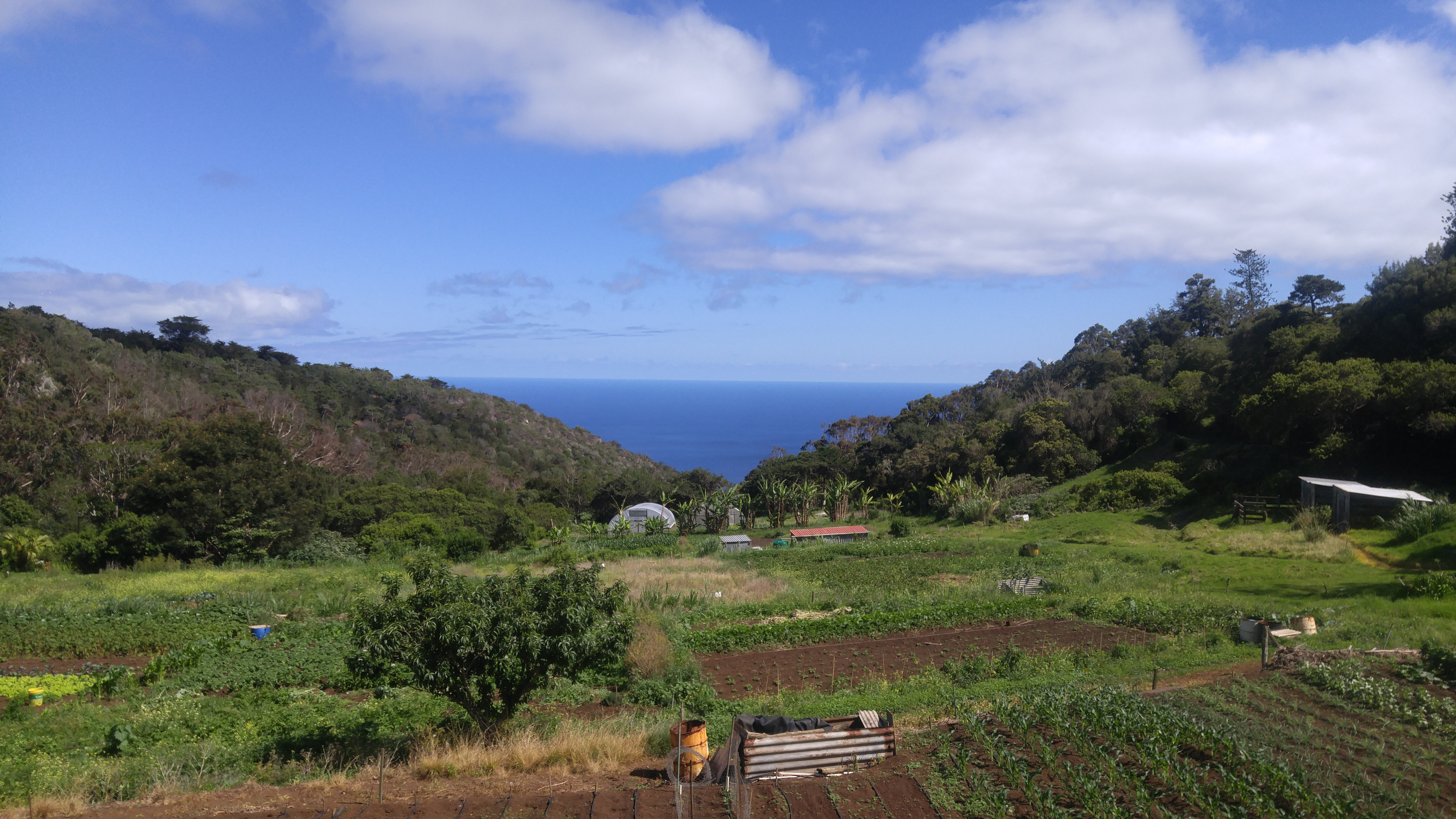
view from Plantation House

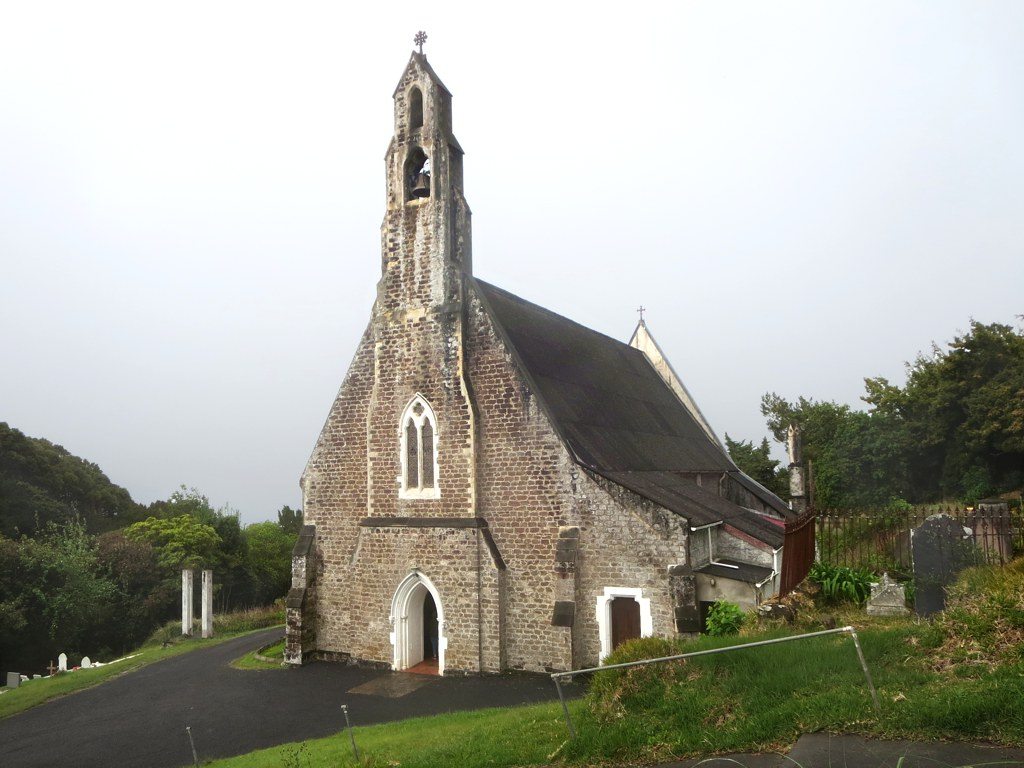
Saint Paul's Cathedral

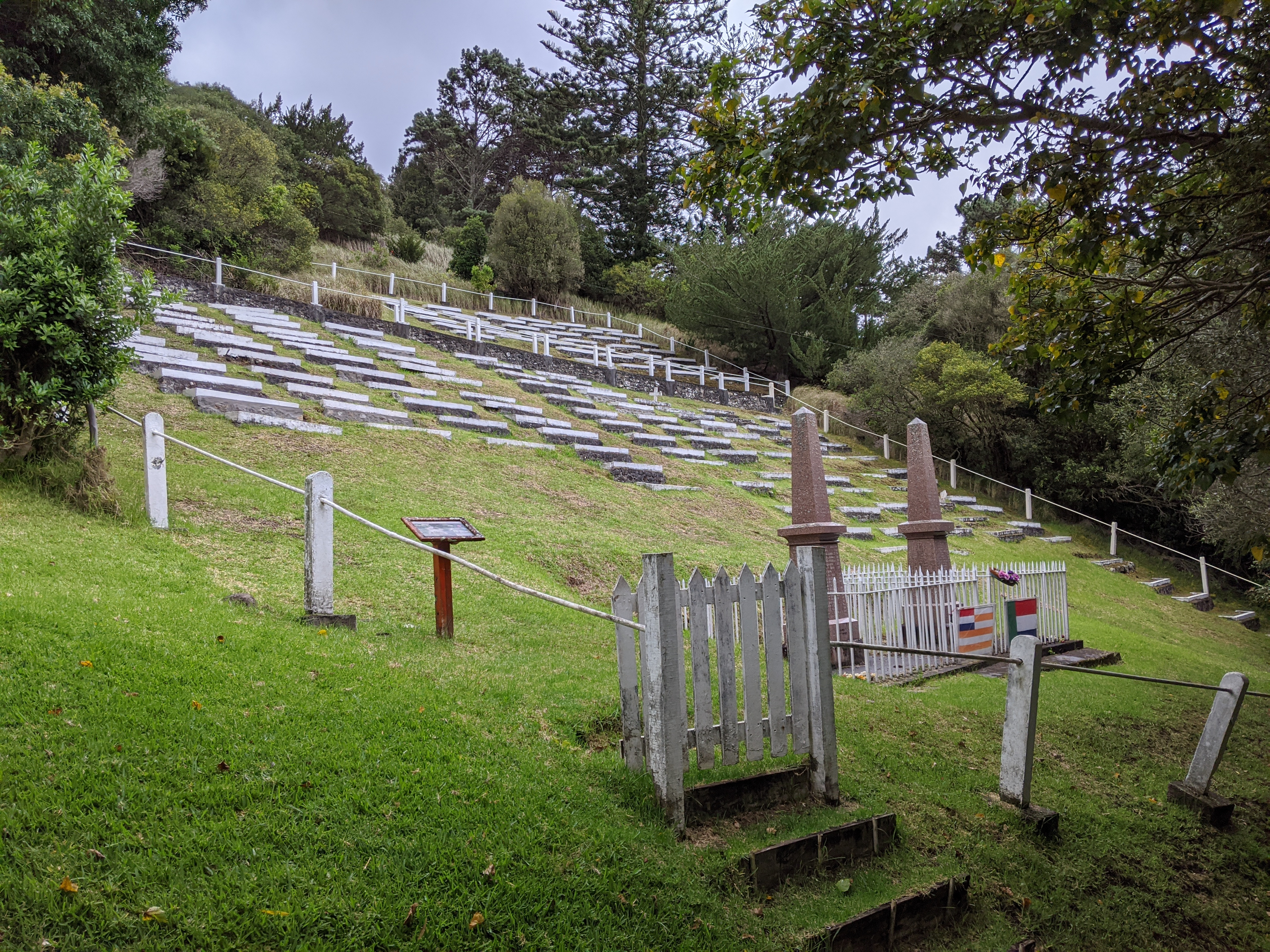
Boer Prisoner of War Cemetery in Knollcombes from below

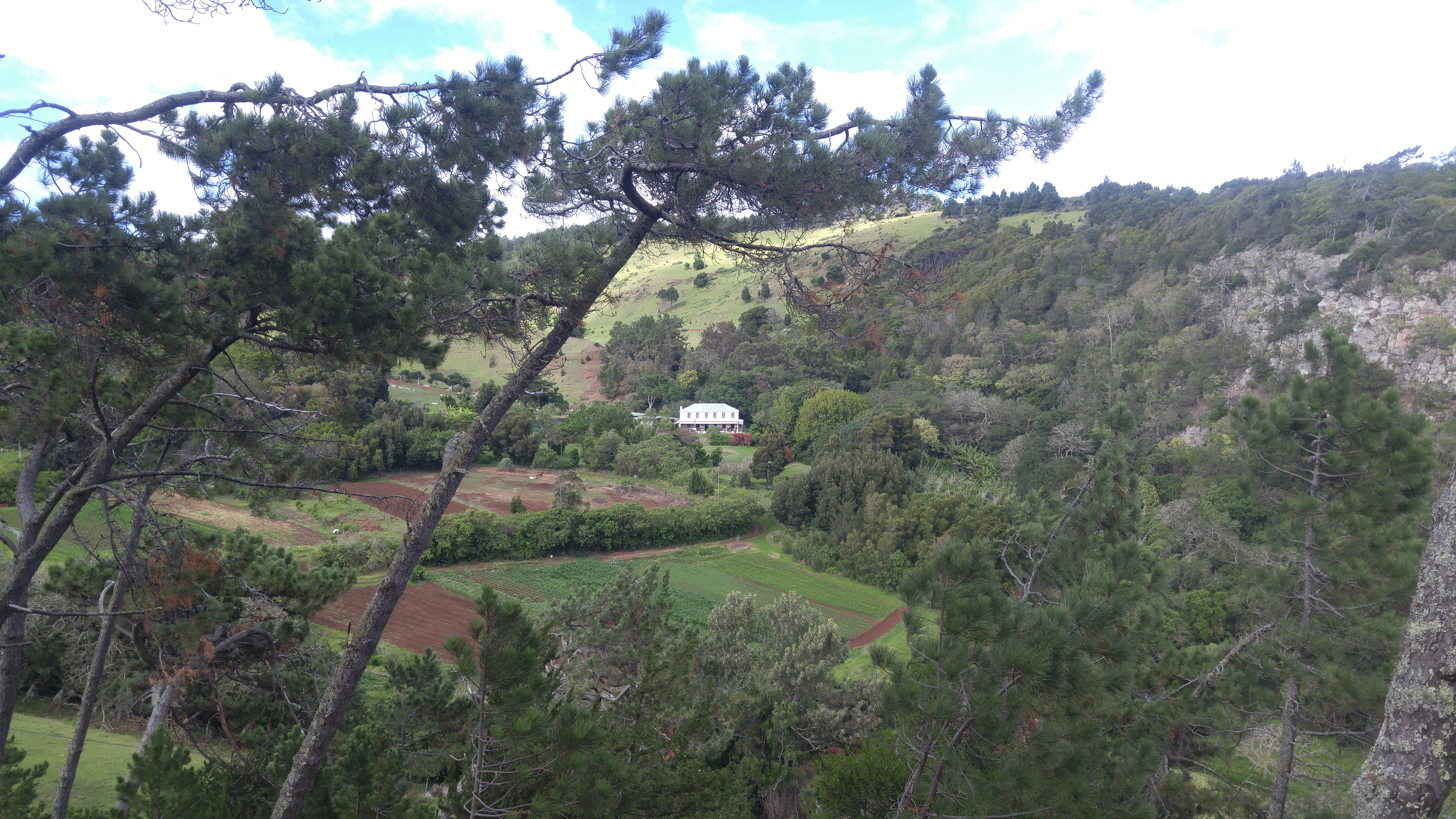
near Rosemary Plain

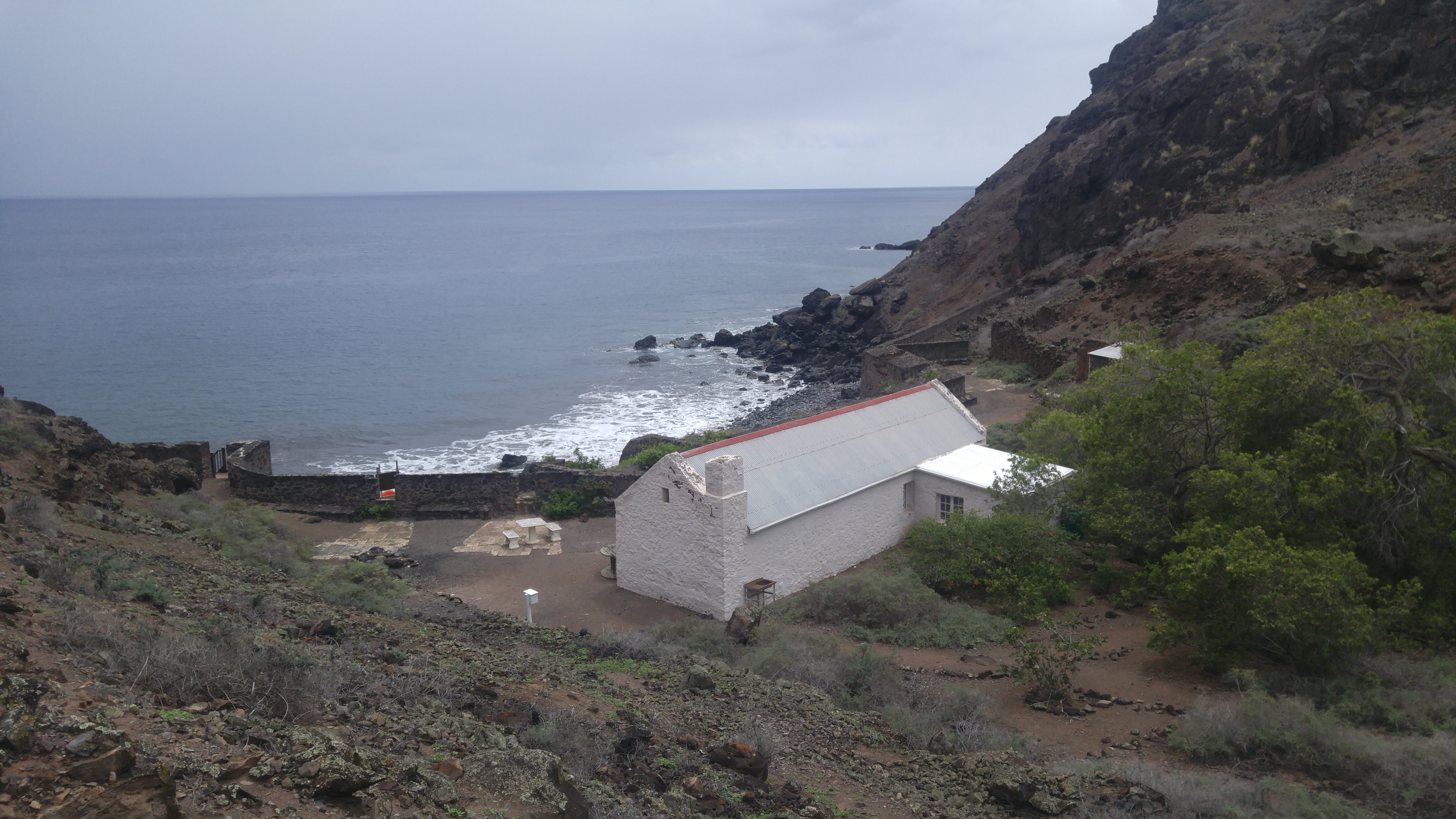
guardhouse at Lemon Valley Bay

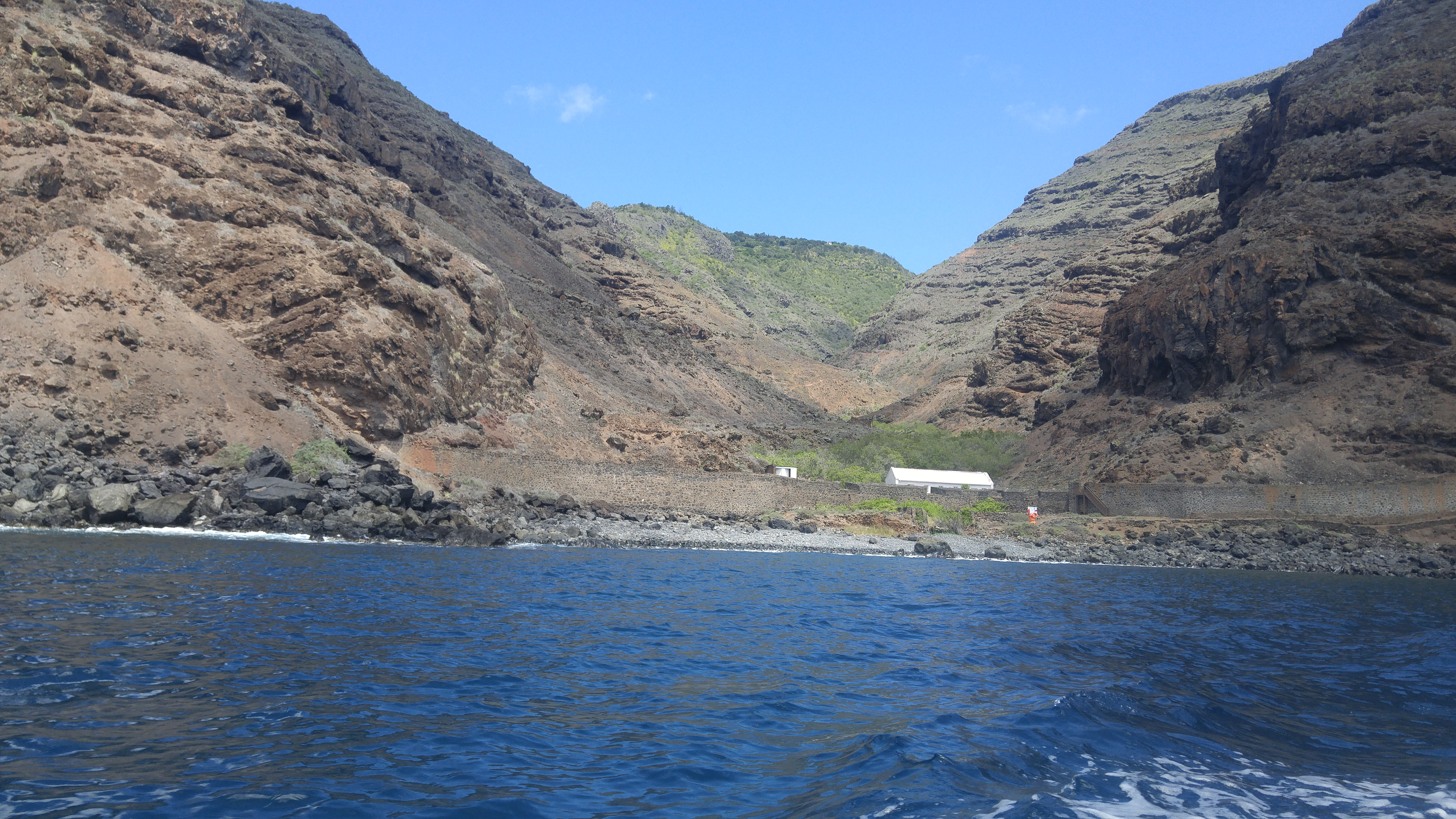
Lemon Valley from the sea

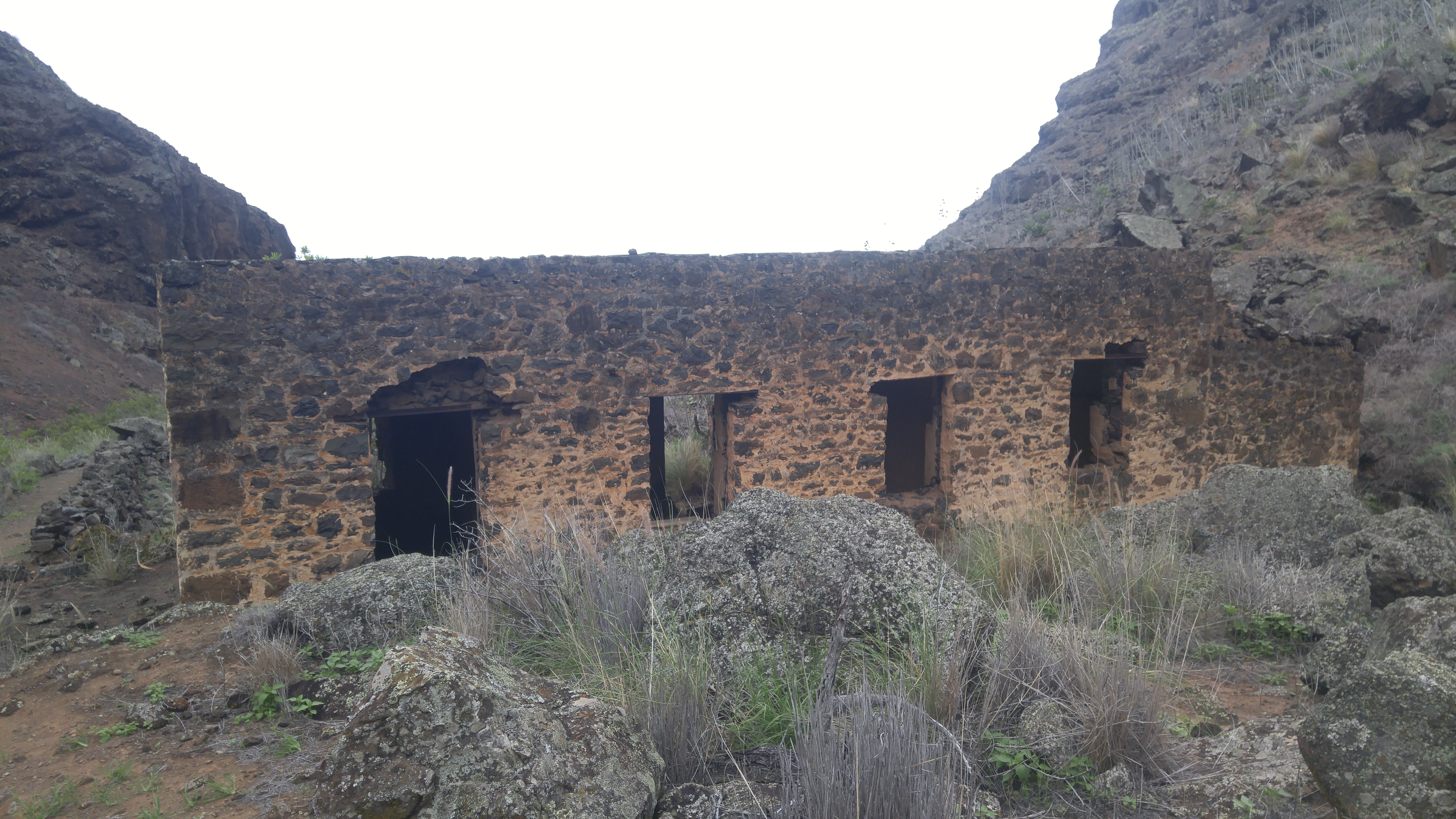
ruins of the old quarantine station

== Bibliography ==
- Denholm, Ken. "South Atlantic Fortress" (PDF). Saint Helena Island Info. Archived from the original (PDF) on 26 November 2016.
