= Tu'i Malila =

Radiated tortoise (1777–1966)

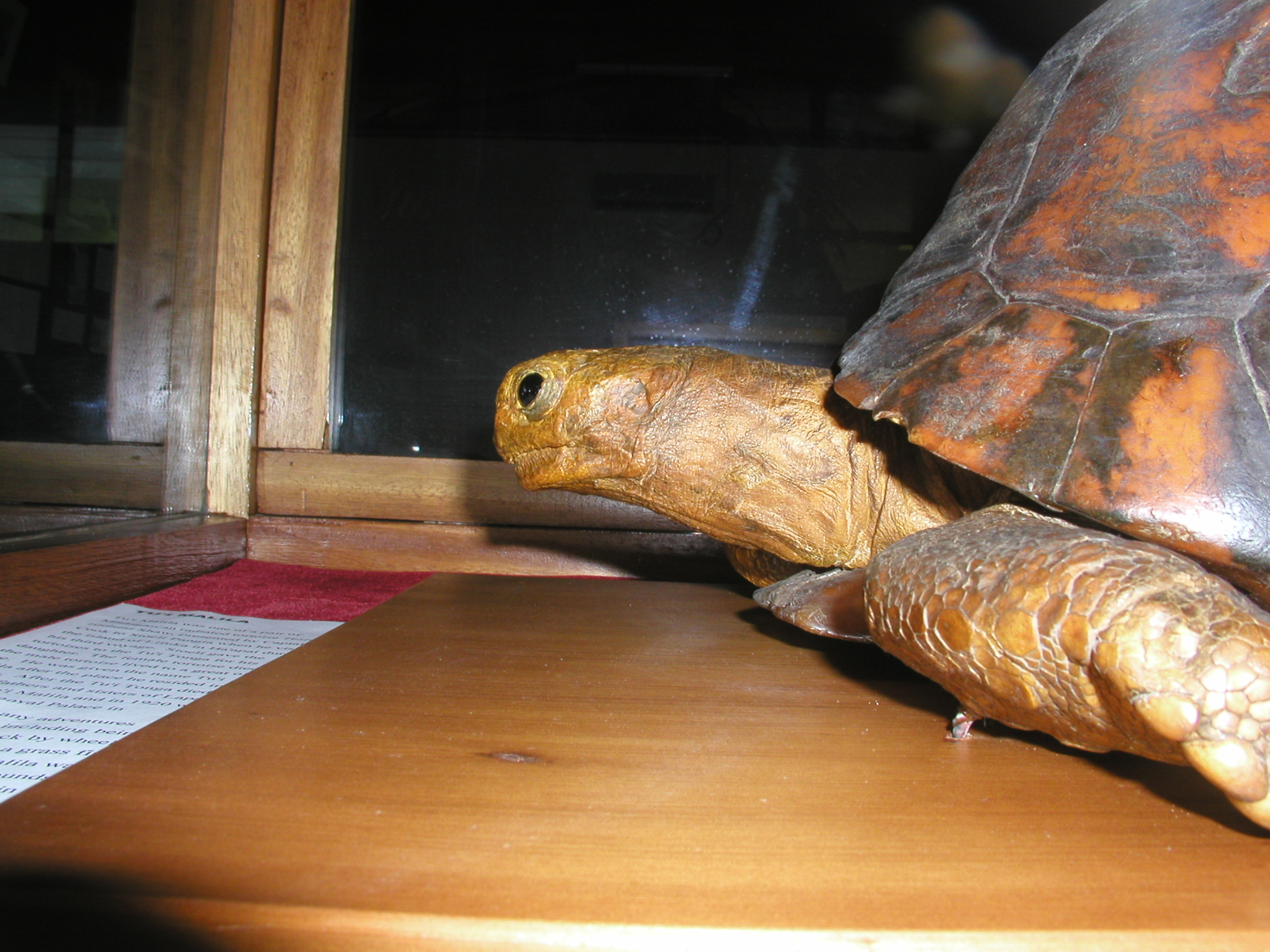
- Tu'i Malila's preserved body, 2002
- Species: Astrochelys radiata
- Sex: Female
- Hatched: c. 1777 (claimed); Madagascar?
- Died: May 16, 1966 (aged about 188); Tonga
- Resting place: Royal Palace of Tonga

Tu'i Malila (1777 – 16 May 1966) was a tortoise that Captain James Cook was traditionally said to have given to the royal family of Tonga. She was a female radiated tortoise (Astrochelys radiata) from Madagascar. Although believed to have been a male during its life, examination after the tortoise's death suggested it was female.

The name means King Malila in the Tongan language.

== Life ==
According to one story, Tu'i Malila was one of a pair of tortoises given by Captain Cook to the Tongan royal family upon his visit to Tonga in July 1777. The other tortoise reportedly died shortly after Cook's visit. This story has been discounted on the basis that Cook made no mention of the event in his journal, although it has been suggested that the tortoise may have been the gift of a member of Cook's crew instead.

According to other sources, George Tupou I obtained her from a vessel which called in Haʻapai in the first half of the 19th century.

The tortoise was taken to Muʻa, where it was kept in a compound named Malila, from which she got her name. Around 1921, Sālote Tupou III moved the tortoise to the Royal Palace. Despite being kicked by a horse and run over several times, the tortoise continued her life, although she was left blind and with a badly wounded right-hand side.

During Queen Elizabeth II's Royal Tour of Tonga in 1953, Tu'i Malila was one of the first animals shown to the monarch on her official visit to the island nation. It appears while being fed by the royal children in the British Pathe colour newsreel of the visit.

The tortoise died on 16 May 1966, aged approximately 188 years old. Tu'i Malila was listed for some time in the Guinness Book of World Records as the oldest known tortoise. In 2006, a tortoise named Adwaita was claimed by an Indian zoo to be 255 years old at the age of its death, but this was never officially confirmed. In 2022, Jonathan, a tortoise living on the south Atlantic island of Saint Helena exceeded Tu'i Malila's reported age, and is still alive as of 2026.

A Reuters dispatch of the tortoise makes an appearance as an epigraph in Philip K. Dick's Do Androids Dream of Electric Sheep?

== See also ==
- Harriet
- List of long-living organisms
