= Alagba =

Royal tortoise of Ogbomoso, Nigeria

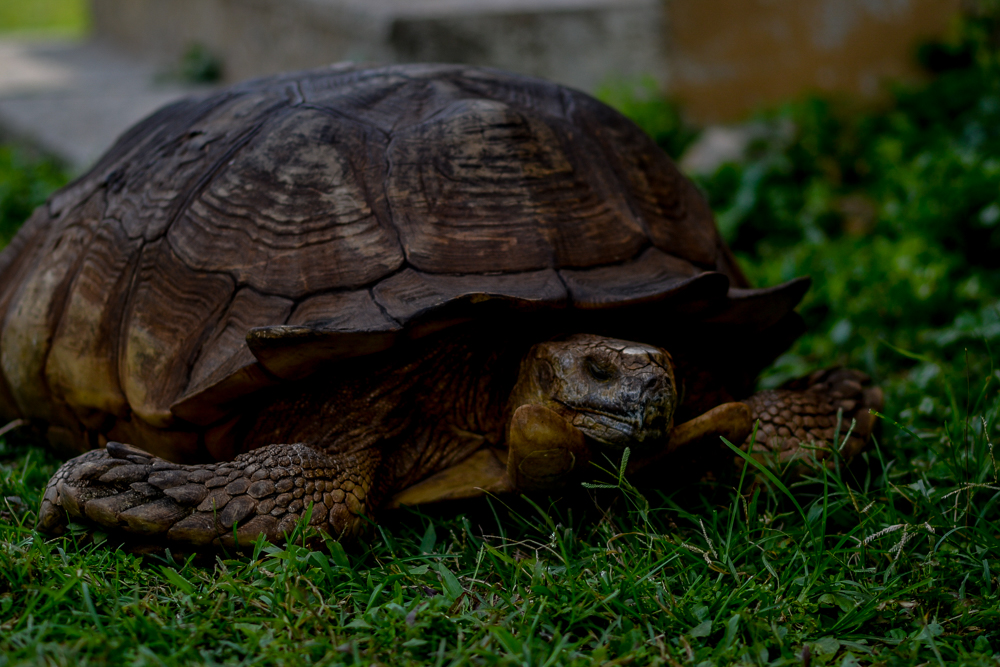
- Species: Centrochelys sulcata
- Born: c.1675
- Died: 3 October 2019; Palace of the Soun of Ogbomoso, Ogbomoso, Oyo State, Nigeria
- Resting place: Palace of the Soun of Ogbomoso
- Owner: Soun of Ogbomoso

Alagba was a tortoise that resided in the palace of the Soun of Ogbomoso in Ogbomoso, Oyo State, southwestern Nigeria, until its death on 3 October 2019. The palace maintained that the animal had lived for approximately 344 years, although reptile experts disputed the claim, as they considered such an age scientifically implausible for the species.The animal was categorised as an African spurred tortoise (Centrochelys sulcata) rather than a giant tortoise. It became a well-known cultural symbol of Ogbomoso and attracted visitors from within Nigeria and abroad during the later years of its life. Its death in October 2019 received coverage from several national and international news organisations.

== Name ==
The name Alagba is a Yoruba term meaning elder, or elderly one. The animal was referred to in this manner within the palace and in local usage throughout the period of its residence there.

== History and provenance ==
According to oral tradition maintained by the palace of the Soun of Ogbomoso, the tortoise was brought to the palace by Isan Okumoyede, the third Soun of Ogbomoso, upon his return from a military expedition. Okumoyede reigned from approximately 1770 to 1797. The palace held that the animal had already been alive for a considerable period prior to its arrival, which formed the basis of the claim that it was 344 years old at the time of its death in 2019. If the palace account is accepted, the animal would have lived through the reigns of eighteen successive Souns of Ogbomoso.The BBC noted that Okumoyede's reign commenced only approximately two centuries before the tortoise's death, which would account for no more than 200 years of the claimed lifespan within the palace's own historical framework, leaving the remainder unverifiable by any written record.

== Species and physical description ==
Following the animal's death, photographs were examined by Tim Skelton, curator of reptiles at Bristol Zoo, who identified the tortoise as an African spurred tortoise (Centrochelys sulcata) rather than any species of giant tortoise. This classification was directly relevant to the age dispute, as giant tortoises are known to attain exceptional longevity, whereas the African spurred tortoise does not. No source described the animal as unusually large, which was noted as inconsistent with expectations for an animal of the alleged age.

== Care and daily routine ==
During its residence in the palace, Alagba was assigned a minimum of two dedicated attendants drawn from the palace staff. It occupied a small apartment within the palace compound and was provided with a standard of care that palace staff described as comparable to that extended to persons of rank.Samuel Ojo, one of the designated carers, stated in a 2018 interview that the animal consumed a variety of foods common to the Yoruba diet, including pounded yam, amala, rice, beans, plantain, and fruits such as pawpaw and watermelon, as well as grass and vegetable matter. A second attendant, Oladimeji Olaleke, stated that the animal was bathed weekly, every Saturday, and consumed water approximately once a fortnight, drinking roughly four litres at each instance, with movement toward the palace entrance serving as the signal to attendants that water was required.

== Cultural and religious significance ==
The palace and local community attributed spiritual significance to the tortoise. Visitors reportedly prayed in the animal's presence, in the belief that it possessed healing powers and conferred blessings, longevity, and protection upon the palace and the town of Ogbomoso. The palace confirmed that the animal attracted visitors from across Nigeria and from abroad on a regular basis during the later years of its life.Adedeji Atiba, a scholar from Ogbomoso resident in Europe at the time of the animal's death, told TheCable that when he identified himself as being from Ogbomoso, interlocutors would inquire after the tortoise before asking after the king. Toyin Ajamu, Private Secretary to the reigning Soun, Oba Oladunni Oyewumi, confirmed that the king had expended personal resources in providing for the animal's welfare and that two members of the palace staff were assigned exclusively to its care.

== Claimed age and expert opinion ==
The claim that the tortoise was 344 years old at death was disputed by reptile specialists. Tim Skelton of Bristol Zoo described the alleged age as “impossible”, stating that while giant tortoises may, in exceptional cases, survive to approximately 200 years, the African spurred tortoise has a typical lifespan of between 70 and 100 years. John Wilkinson, a professional herpetologist, described the claimed age as unlikely in the extreme, and suggested that the most probable explanation was that the palace had, over time, replaced one tortoise with another without altering the attributed identity or age.Various figures circulated at different times. A 2011 bulletin by NTA News24 placed the animal's age at 330, which would have made it 338 at the time of death; the same broadcast separately cited the figure of 325, producing an internal inconsistency. Palace attendants, in 2018, stated the age to be 347, which would have placed it at approximately 348 at the time of death. TheCable noted that no definitive record of the animal's birth existed and that carbon dating would be required to approach any reliable estimate.The BBC reported that the oldest living tortoise and the oldest individual animal on record at the time of Alagba's death was considered to be Jonathan, a giant tortoise resident on Saint Helena, then estimated to be 187 years of age. TheCable also noted the case of Adwaita, a tortoise of Seychelles origin that died in Kolkata, India, and to whom an alleged age of 255 years had been attributed, though that figure was likewise subject to uncertainty.

== Death and aftermath ==
Alagba died on the morning of 3 October 2019, following a short illness of several days. Its death occurred during the reign of Oba Oladunni Oyewumi, who was described by palace officials as having taken particular interest in the animal's welfare. The palace announced that the remains would be preserved for the purposes of tourism and historical documentation. Oba Afolabi Olaoye, who was the reigning Soun as of early 2025, was reported to have confirmed continued plans for preservation of the remains.

== See also ==
- Jonathan (tortoise)
- Adwaita
- Baba (tortoise)
