= Nature Protection Trust of Seychelles =

The Nature Protection Trust of Seychelles was established in 1992 as the first environmental non-governmental organisation registered in Seychelles and was active up to 2011 when it ceased operating.

NPTS aimed to restore and preserve viable ecosystems, taking a long-term view of ecology. Much of the NPTS work involved monitoring and scientific research prior to intervention. This approach provided new insights into ecological problems and ecosystem management. Projects carried out included

== Conservation ==
Silhouette Conservation Project - conservation of the ecosystems, plants and animals of Silhouette Island Seychelles Giant Tortoise Conservation Project - conservation of Seychelles giant tortoises Seychelles Terrapin Conservation Project - conservation of the Critically Endangered Seychelles Pelusios terrapins

== Research ==
Indian Ocean Biodiversity Assessment - assessment of the status of biodiversity in the Western Indian Ocean

== Publication ==
- Seychelles Biodiversity monographs
- Island Biology monographs
- Phelsuma - scientific journal dedicated to the Western Indian Ocean
- Birdwatch - natural history of the Seychelles islands
