= Baba (tortoise) =

Tortoise at the palace of the Alaafin of Oyo (died 2026)

- Species: Tortoise (species not independently established)
- Born: Disputed; estimated by the palace as approximately 1606
- Died: September 2026; Palace of the Alaafin of Oyo, Oyo, Oyo State, Nigeria
- Owner: Alaafin of Oyo
- Named after: Baba, a Yoruba word meaning father or elder

Baba was a tortoise that resided at the palace of the Alaafin of Oyo in Oyo, Oyo State, Nigeria, until its death in September 2026. The palace attributed an age of approximately 420 years to the animal and traced its origin to Oyo-Ile, the ancient capital of the Old Oyo Empire. The age claim was not supported by birth records or independent scientific evidence, and Pulse Nigeria noted that it would make Baba more than twice as old as Jonathan, the Seychelles giant tortoise recognised by Guinness World Records as the world's oldest living tortoise at 194 years in 2026. Baba had been cared for by successive Alaafins and was described by palace officials as a cultural and historical symbol of the Oyo Kingdom.

== History and provenance ==
According to oral history maintained by the palace of the Alaafin of Oyo, Baba originated from Oyo-Ile, the seat of the old Oyo Empire, and was subsequently brought to the present palace in Oyo town. The palace stated that successive Alaafins had cared for the tortoise, regarding it as part of the historical relics associated with the palace. The incumbent Alaafin, Oba Abimbola Akeem Owoade I, was reported to have met Baba already resident in the palace following his ascension to the throne.

If the palace estimate of approximately 420 years were accepted, the tortoise would have been born around the year 1606, predating the existence of modern Nigeria by several centuries.

== Care and daily routine ==
Two palace officials were assigned responsibility for Baba's welfare. The tortoise was reported to have been fed watermelon, corn pap wrapped in leaves, and grass. The palace described Baba as friendly in disposition and noted that his reported age and size made him an attraction for visitors to the palace, with the area around his quarters described as a tourist point within the palace grounds.

== Death and burial ==
Baba fell ill on Monday, a date in September 2026, and stopped eating before dying. The Director of Media and Publicity to the Alaafin, Bode Durojaiye, confirmed the death in a statement issued in Ibadan on Thursday 17 September 2026. The tortoise was subsequently buried at the palace. Durojaiye stated that the incumbent Alaafin planned to preserve Baba's memory for future generations.

== See also ==
- Jonathan (tortoise)
- Adwaita
- Alagba
