= Jonathan (tortoise) =

Oldest known living land animal (hatched c. 1832)

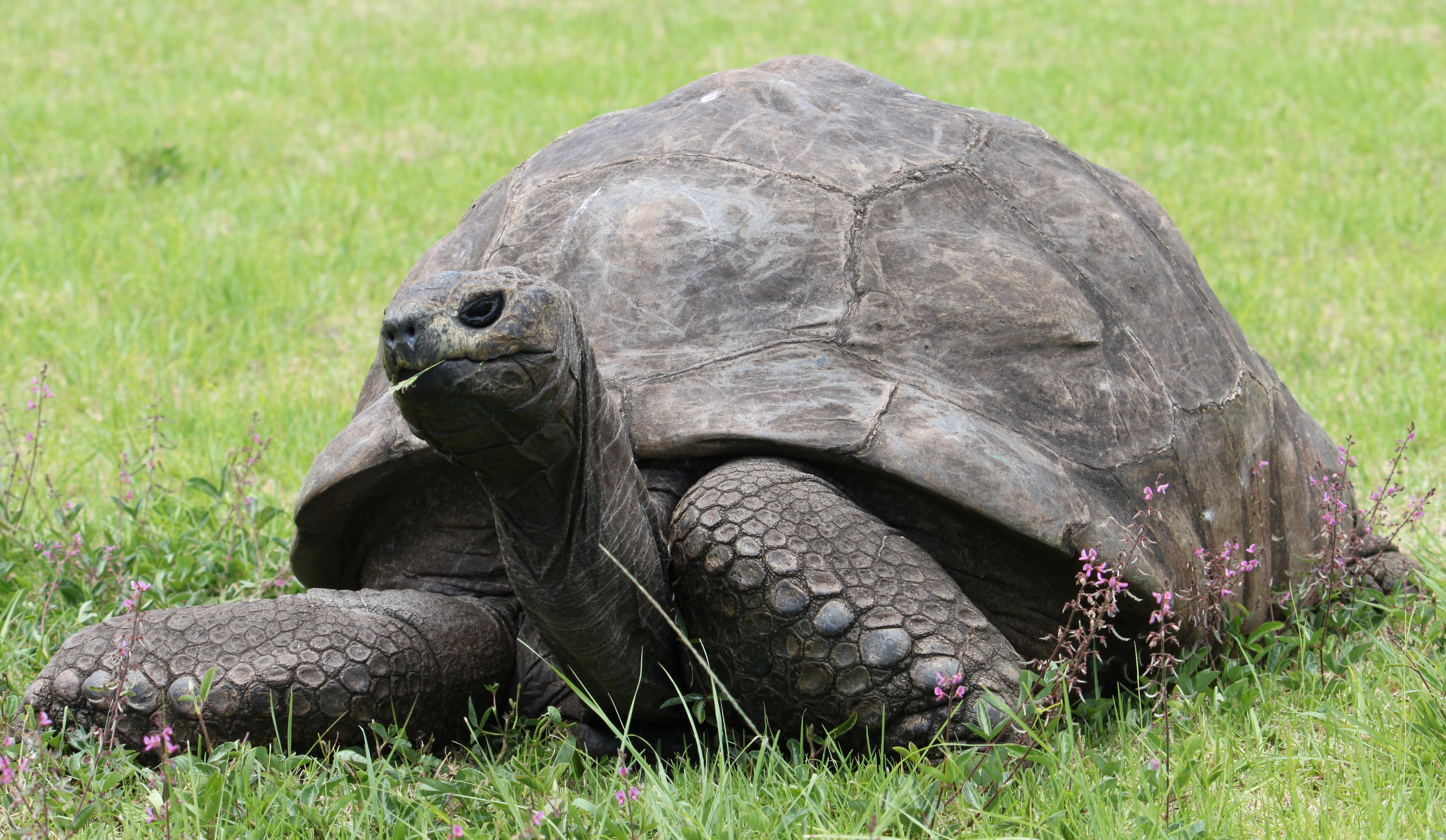
- Jonathan in March 2020
- Species: Aldabra giant tortoise (Aldabrachelys gigantea)
- Sex: Male
- Hatched: c. 1832 (age 193–194); Seychelles, British Mauritius
- Mate: Frederik (Note: Frederik was thought to be female until 2017, and had formerly been named Frederica.) (1991–present)
- Weight: 100–150 kg (200–350 lb)

Jonathan (hatched c. 1832)is a Seychelles giant tortoise (Aldabrachelys gigantea hololissa), a subspecies of the Aldabra giant tortoise (Aldabrachelys gigantea). His age is estimated to be 194 as of 2026, making him the oldest known living land animal as well as the oldest verified tortoise in recorded history. He was officially named in Guinness World Records "Icons" list. Jonathan lives on the grounds of the Plantation House on Saint Helena, a British Overseas Territory in the South Atlantic Ocean.

== History ==
Jonathan, hatched c. 1832, was brought to Saint Helena from the Seychelles (then under the British Crown colony of Mauritius) in the Indian Ocean in 1882, along with three other tortoises at around 50 years of age, as a gift to Sir William Grey-Wilson, who later became governor of the island. He was named in the 1930s by Governor of Saint Helena Sir Spencer Davis and has lived through 31 governors' terms. He continues to live on the grounds of Plantation House, the official residence of the governor, and is cared for by the government of Saint Helena. His exact age is unknown, but in November 2022 Nigel Phillips, Governor of Saint Helena, granted him an official birthday of 4 December.

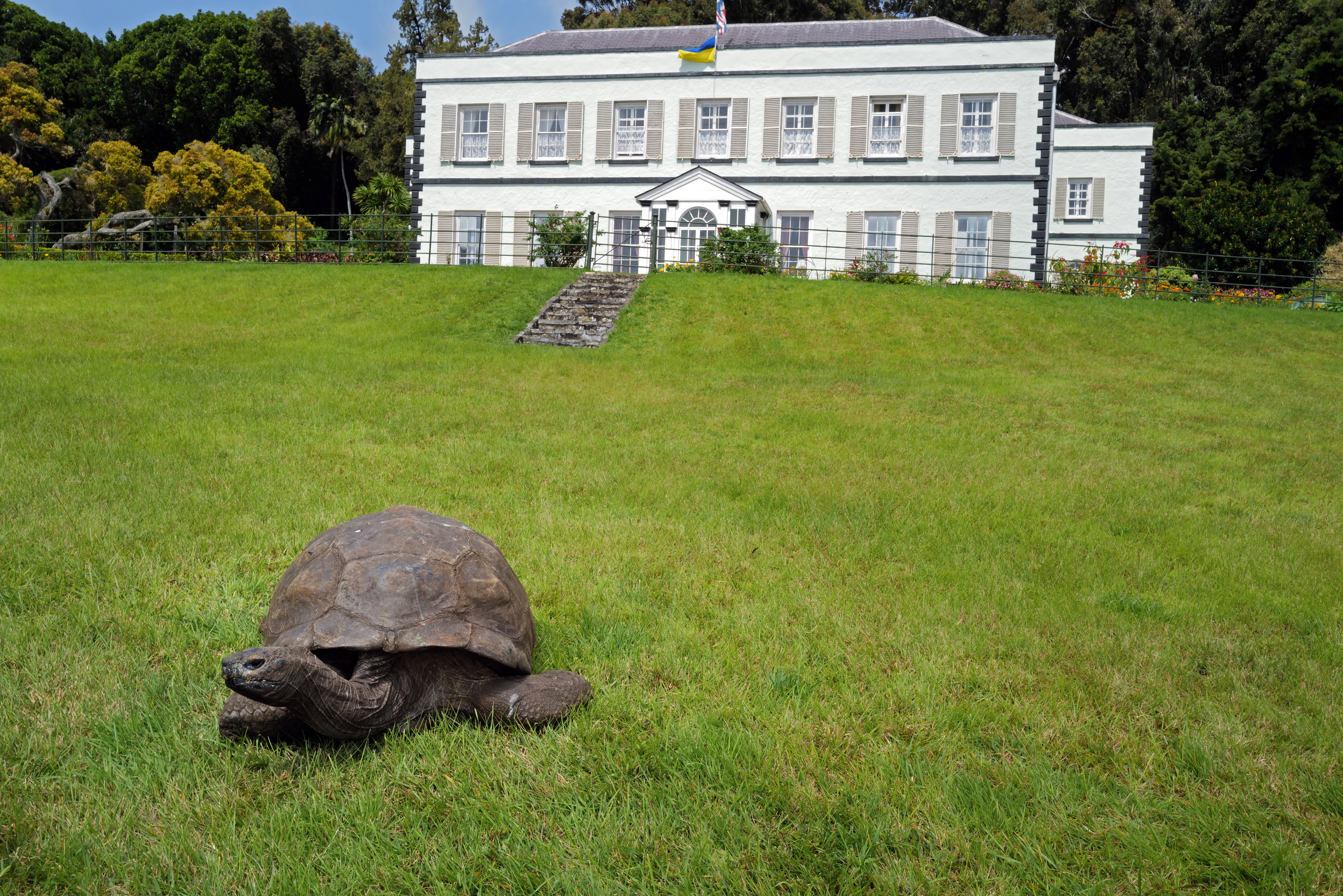
Jonathan exploring the paddock in front of Plantation House, 2022

In December 2015, the Saint Helena veterinarian Joe Hollins said that Jonathan was "alive and well [...] He's blind from cataracts, has lost his sense of smell, and so cannot detect food ... but he has retained excellent hearing." In January 2016, the BBC reported that Jonathan was given a new diet intended to keep him healthy and extend his life. Due to his advanced age, Jonathan spends his days doing almost everything with his mate Frederik, another male tortoise he was introduced to in 1991.

To mark Jonathan's supposed 190th birthday in February 2022, island officials planned to make a series of commemorative stamps and visitors received a certificate featuring a photograph of his first known footprint.

On 4 December 2022, local residents arranged three days of Jonathan's birthday celebration, presenting a cake made entirely from his favourite foods.

In January 2024, Prince Edward, Duke of Edinburgh, saw Jonathan during a visit to St. Helena. Jonathan had previously met the Duke's mother Elizabeth II and grandfather George VI in 1947. Prince Philip visited in 1957.

== Age ==
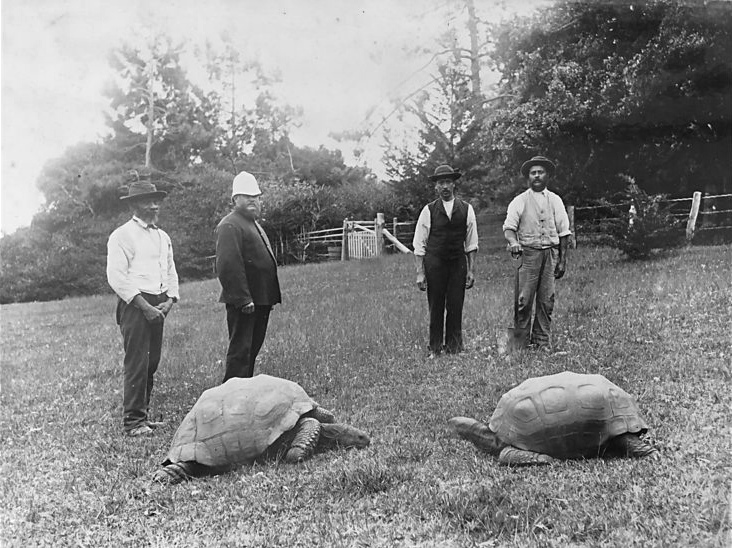
Jonathan (left) with another giant tortoise (1886; aged 53–54)

His age is estimated because he was "fully mature" when brought to Saint Helena in 1882. "Fully mature" means at least 50 years old, giving him a hatching date no later than 1832. A photograph featuring Jonathan originally thought to date from 1902 actually dates from 1886, showing Jonathan four years after his arrival on Saint Helena. Measurements taken from the photograph show that he was fully mature in 1886.

In 2022, Jonathan's estimated age exceeded that of the tortoise that Guinness World Records had recognised as the oldest recorded ever, Tu'i Malila, who died in Tonga in 1966 at the age of 189. Adwaita, an Aldabra giant tortoise that died in 2006, is believed to have lived to the age of 255 years, but this has not been confirmed.

== In media ==
In February 2014, as part of the Queen's Baton Relay ahead of the 2014 Commonwealth Games, the baton visited Saint Helena. Governor Mark Capes, while holding the baton, posed for a photo alongside Jonathan in the grounds of Plantation House.

BBC Radio featured Jonathan in an episode of From Our Own Correspondent in March 2014 after ocean rower Sally Kettle visited Saint Helena.

The Saint Helena five-pence coin has Jonathan on its reverse.

On 1 April 2026, a social media account impersonating veterinarian Joe Hollins claimed that Jonathan had died overnight, and said it was not an April fools' day prank. The account then began using the subsequent fervour to solicit cryptocurrency donations. The post reached two million views by 2 April and multiple news outlets, including the BBC, reported Jonathan died before it was found to be a hoax.

== See also ==
- Harriet (tortoise)
- Alagba
- Baba (tortoise)
