= Adwaita =

Aldabra giant tortoise (c. 1750 – 2006)

- Species: Aldabra giant tortoise
- Sex: Male
- Hatched: c. 1750–1826; Aldabra Atoll
- Died: 22 March 2006 (aged 179–256); Alipore Zoological Gardens, Kolkata, India
- Weight: 250 kg (551 lb)

Adwaita (from अद्वैत, meaning "one and only" in Sanskrit) (c. 1750 – 22 March 2006), also spelled Adwaitya or Addwaita, was a male Aldabra giant tortoise that lived in the Alipore Zoological Gardens of Kolkata, India. At the time of his death in 2006, Adwaita was believed to be amongst the longest-living animals in the world.

The animal is claimed to have been one of four tortoises that lived at Robert Clive's estate at Barrackpore, in the northern suburbs of Calcutta. Clive was said to have received the tortoises following his victory at the Battle of Plassey in 1757, although this story is unsubstantiated.

Adwaita was transferred to the Alipore Zoo in Calcutta in 1875 or 1876 by Carl Louis Schwendler, the founder of the zoo. Adwaita lived in his enclosure in the zoo until his death on 22 March 2006 at an estimated age of 255.

== Description ==
Weighing 250 kg (551 lb), Adwaita was a solitary animal with no records of his progeny. He lived on a diet of wheat bran, carrots, lettuce, soaked gram (chickpea), bread, grass and salt.

== Age ==
His shell cracked in late 2005, and a wound developed in the flesh underneath the crack. The wound became infected and eventually led to his death from liver failure on 22 March 2006. Adwaita is claimed to have been 255 years old at the time of his death, although this claim is unsubstantiated. If Adwaita's claimed age were true, he would be the oldest known tortoise, outliving Harriet by 80 years, Tu'i Malila by 67 years, and making him 63 years older than the current record holder Jonathan.

== See also ==
- Jonathan (tortoise)
- Baba (tortoise)
- Alagba
