= John L. Behler =

American naturalist, herpetologist, and activist

John L. Behler (1946 – January 31, 2006) was an American naturalist, herpetologist, author, and activist known for his work in conserving endangered species of turtles, snakes, and other reptiles. He served as curator of herpetology at the Bronx Zoo, part of the Wildlife Conservation Society from 1976 to 2006. He co-chaired the IUCN Tortoise and Freshwater Turtle Specialist Group, and was a founding member of the Turtle Survival Alliance, which co-present the Behler Turtle Conservation Award with the Turtle Conservancy and Turtle Conservation Fund. The Behler Turtle Conservation Award is a major annual award to honor leadership in the field of freshwater turtle and tortoise conservation. The Turtle Conservancy named its captive breeding center, the Behler Chelonian Center, in his honor.

== Behler Chelonian Center ==
One of John Behler's lasting legacies is the Behler Chelonian Center, which John cofounded with Eric Goode in 2004 along with Bill Holmstrom and Maurice Rodriguez. The Behler Chelonian Center is an AZA accredited 501-C3 not for profit organization originally created to act as the steward of the Wildlife Conservation Society's long term collection of over 150 critically endangered chelonians. The center is located in southern California and is operated by the Turtle Conservancy, a global turtle and tortoise conservation organization. It has become the most successful captive breeding facility for endangered turtles and tortoises managing and breeding many of the world's most threatened chelonians.

The Behler Chelonian Center was the first institution in the world to ever send captive bred turtles back to their range country for reintroduction. This is an ongoing project, with Kadoorie Farm and Botanic Garden and the Behler Chelonian Center sending the Critically Endangered golden coin turtle (Cuora trifasciata) back to Hong Kong.

Today the Turtle Conservancy and Behler Chelonian Center have ongoing conservation programs around the world, protecting the Critically Endangered ploughshare tortoise (Astrochelys yniphora) in Madagascar, as well as some of the last important habitat for the Critically Endangered geometric tortoise (Psammobates geometricus) in South Africa, with additional programs in Mexico, Southeast Asia, China, United States, South America, and the Caribbean.

== Publications ==
National Audubon Society First Field Guide Reptiles
Scholastic
April 1, 1999

Alligators and Crocodiles (Worldlife Library)
Voyageur Press
June 13, 1998
