= ANKMY1 =

Protein in humans

Identifiers
- Aliases: ANKMY1, ZMYND13, ankyrin repeat and MYND domain containing 1
- External IDs: MGI: 3045261; GeneCards: ANKMY1

Gene location (Human)
Chr.	Chromosome 2 (human)
Band	2q37.3	Start	240,479,422 bp
Band	2q37.3	End	240,569,209 bp

Gene location (Mouse)
Chr.	Chromosome 1 (mouse)
Band	1|1 D	Start	92,787,525 bp
Band	1|1 D	End	92,830,628 bp
RNA expression pattern
Bgee	Human / Mouse (ortholog); Top expressed in: right uterine tube; right testis; left testis; olfactory zone of nasal mucosa; granulocyte; sural nerve; monocyte; bronchial epithelial cell; canal of the cervix; mucosa of transverse colon / Top expressed in: testicle; spermatocyte; spermatid; embryo; thymus; morula; secondary oocyte; primary oocyte; zygote; ventricular zone; More reference expression data
BioGPS	n/a
Orthologs
Databases	NCBI: entry; OMA: entry
Species	Human	Mouse
Entrez	51281	241158
Ensembl	ENSG00000144504	ENSMUSG00000034212
UniProt	Q9P2S6	Q8C0W1
RefSeq (mRNA)	NM_001282771; NM_001282780; NM_001282781; NM_001308375; NM_016552 NM_017844; NM_001354023; NM_001354024; NM_001354025; NM_001354026	NM_172850; NM_001347091
RefSeq (protein)	NP_001269700; NP_001269709; NP_001269710; NP_001295304; NP_057636 NP_060314; NP_001340952; NP_001340953; NP_001340954; NP_001340955; NP_001269710.1	NP_001334020; NP_766438
Location (UCSC)	Chr 2: 240.48 – 240.57 Mb	Chr 1: 92.79 – 92.83 Mb
PubMed search
- Wikidata
View/Edit Human	View/Edit Mouse

Ankyrin Repeat And MYND Domain Containing 1 (ANKMY1) is a protein that in humans is encoded by the ANKMY1 gene. Known aliases of ANKMY1 include Zinc Finger Myeloid, Nervy and DEAF-1 or ZMYND13.

== Gene ==
The ANKMY1 gene is located on the minus strand of chromosome 2, at 2q37.3 . The gene begins at base position 240,479,422 and ends at position 240,577,988. The coding sequence is 3424 nucleotides long and contains 17 exons.

== mRNA Expression ==
ANKMY1 is ubiquitously expressed in most tissue types in the body.

== Protein ==
The ANKMY1 protein is 941 amino acids long and weighs approximately 105.5 kDa. The pI is 6.3.

=== Domains and motifs ===
ANKMY1 protein contains three MORN domains, seven ANK repeats and a single MYND zinc finger toward the end of the protein.

=== Structure ===
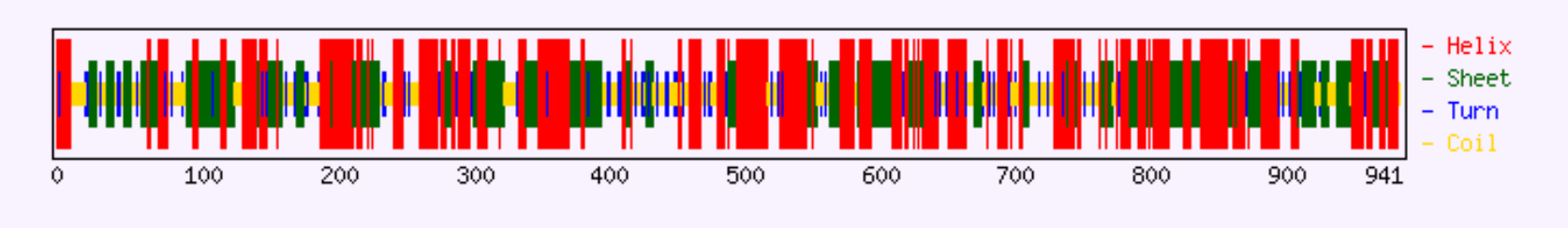
Figure 1. Secondary structure of ANKMY1 with beta sheets (green), alpha helixes (red) and turns (blue).

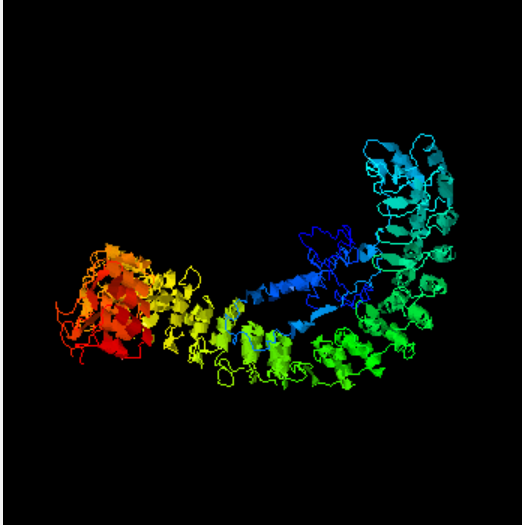
Figure 2. iTasser tertiary structure of ANKMY1.

The ANKMY1 protein contains both beta sheets and alpha helices. The MORN domains are exclusively beta sheets and the alpha helices appear only in the ANK domain.

=== Subcellular location ===
Subcellular location of ANKMY1 protein was found to primarily be in the cytosol. However, ANKMY1 contains nuclear export signals and evidence of nuclear transport indicating it is able to travel between both the nucleus and cytosol.

== Post-translational modifications ==
ANKMY1 protein contains 3 sulfonated Tyrosines at positions 153, 155 and 162. There is also a N-Glycosylation sites at 163. ANKMY1 contains several (87) phosphorylation sites throughout.

== Homology ==
=== Paralogs ===
No paralogs were found for the ANKMY1 gene.

=== Orthologs ===
ANKMY1 has numerous orthologs, strictly among vertebrates. The oldest known ortholog for ANKMY1 is the sea lamprey, an organism that diverged nearly 599 million years ago.

Genus and species	Common name	Taxonomic group	Median Date of Divergence (MYA)	Accession #	Sequence length (aa)	Sequence identity to human protein (%)	Sequence similarity to human protein (%)
Homo Sapiens	Human	Primates	0	NP_057636.2	941	100	100
Mirounga angustirostris	Northern Elephant Seal	Pinnipedia	94	XP_054361851	688	31	37
Vombatus ursinus	Common Wombat	Diprotodontia	160	XP_027717300	1068	47	61
Ornithorhynchus anatinus	Platypus	Monotremata	180	XP_028935005	1054	48	61
Cygnus atratus	Black Swan	Anseriformes	318	XP_050570946	819	39	53
Pelecanus crispus	Dalmatian Pelican	Pelecaniformes	319	XP_009481272	741	42	56
Apteryx rowi	Okarito Brown Kiwi	Apterygiformes	319	XP_025939958	828	38	49
Gopherus evgoodei	Goodes Thronscrub Tortoise	Testudines	319	XP_030431806	1041	44	56
Alligator mississippiensis	American Alligator	Crocodylia	319	XP_014454066	1024	44	56
Dermochelys coriacea	Leatherback Sea Turtle	Testudines	319	XP_043347915	1054	43	56
Sphaerodactylus townsendi	Townsend's Least Gecko	Squamata	319	XP_048362796	1046	40	53
Notechis scutatus	Mainland tiger snake	Squamata	319	XP_026524636	990	36	50
Bombina bombina	Fire-bellied Toad	Salientia	352	XP_053567490	942	39	53
Hyla sarda	Sardinian Tree Frog	Anura	352	XP_056420535	952	35	49
Rhinatrema bivittatum	Two-lined Caecilian	Gymnophiona	352	XP_029472316	1260	32	45
Latimeria chalumnae	West Indian Ocean Coelacanth	Coelacanthiformes	413	XP_014354204	1223	35	48
Chiloscyllium plagiosum	White-Spotted Bamboo Shark	Orectolobiformes	462	XP_043557725	1055	37	51
Amblyraja radiata	Thorny Skate	Rajiformes	465	XP_032887417	1017	37	51
Petromyzon marinus	Sea Lamprey	Petromyzontiformes	599	XP_032831007	1265	28	38

Table 1. Orthologs of ANKMY1 in humans. Sorted first by estimated date of divergence, then by sequence identity to human protein. ANKMY1 is only found in vertebrates, not invertebrates.

== Function ==
The specific MYND finger of ANKMY1 is specialized for protein-protein interactions. MORN repeats are also associated with linking, more specifically linking parasites and their hosts together. ANKMY1's fast evolution rate coupled with its binding capabilities make it a good candidate for cellular defense. ANKMY1 was found to interact with several proteins within the cell (Table 2).

=== Interacting proteins ===
Name	Function	Subcellular Location
MKRN2 Opposite Strand	N/A	Golgi Apparatus
THAP Domain Containing 4	N/A	Mostly cytoplasm, some nucleus
Zinc Finger Protein 227	May be involved in transcriptional regulation	Nucleus
Zygote Arrest Protein 1	N/A	Cytoplasm
FERM, ARHGEF and pleckstrin domain-containing protein 2	Plays a role in TNFSF11-mediated osteoclast differentiation, especially in podosome rearrangement and reorganization of the actin cytoskeleton. Regulates the activation of ITGB3, integrin signaling and cell adhesion	Cytosol
Stress-associated endoplasmic reticulum protein 2	May protect unfolded target proteins against degradation and facilitate correct glycosylation	Endoplasmic Reticulum
Thymidylate kinase	Catalyzes the conversion of dTMP to dTDP	Cytosol/Nucleus
Serine/threonine-protein Kinase 25	Targets to the Golgi apparatus where it appears to regulate protein transport events, cell adhesion, and polarity complexes important for cell migration.	Golgi/Extracellular
Paired Box Protein Pax-9	Transcription factor required for normal development of thymus, parathyroid glands, ultimobranchial bodies, teeth, skeletal elements of skull and larynx as well as distal limbs	Nucleus
Receptor Transporter Protein 5	N/A	Cytosol

Table 2. Potential ANKMY1 protein-protein interactions drawn from the STRING database. "N/A" indicates unknown function.

== Clinical significance ==
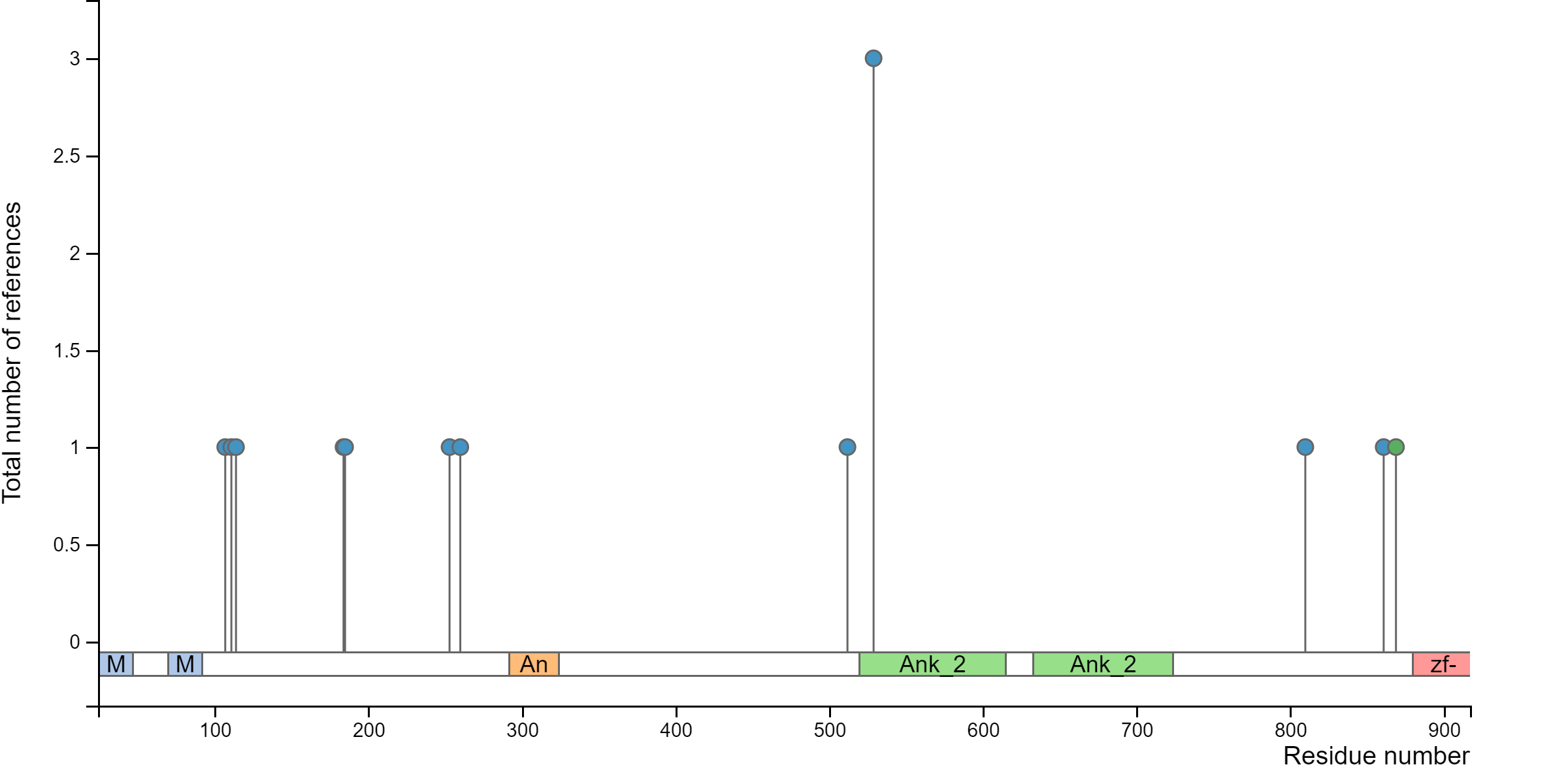
Figure 3. The lollipops represent recurrent and possibly oncogenic missense mutations. The blue heads indicate phosphorylation and the green indicates acetylation. Graph also illustrates the MORN Repeats, ANK repeats and Zinc finger.

Missense mutations commonly resulting in oncogenic growths were identified at various sites within the coding region. Via text-mining a link between increased expression of the ANKMY1 gene and longer time periods of metastasis-free survival in Osteosarcoma patients. ANKMY1 also shows elevated expression in the omental adipose tissue of obese children.
