= Astrochelys rogerbouri =

Astrochelys rogerbouri Temporal range: Holocene

Conservation status
- Extinct (before 954 AD)

Scientific classification
- Kingdom: Animalia
- Phylum: Chordata
- Class: Reptilia
- Order: Testudines
- Suborder: Cryptodira
- Family: Testudinidae
- Genus: Astrochelys
- Species: †A. rogerbouri

Binomial name
- †Astrochelys rogerbouri Kehlmaier et al., 2023

Extinct species of tortoise

Astrochelys rogerbouri is an extinct tortoise species in the family Testudinidae which formerly lived in Madagascar.

== Discovery and naming ==
The type specimen, MNHN.F.MAD480, is a nearly complete tibia and was collected in June 1900 in Ambolisatra, Madagascar by Guillaume Grandidier. It is kept at the Muséum national d'histoire naturelle. This material was originally assigned as a juvenile specimen of Aldabrachelys abrupta, likely as the two share a type locality, and it was only found to represent a new species after DNA analysis.

The specific name honors Roger Bour, a herpetologist and expert on western Indian Ocean giant tortoises who helped in the investigation describing this species.

== Description ==
Astrochelys rogerbouri was a large tortoise species, with an estimated straight carapace length of 50 cm (20 in). This matches the size of its congeneric relative, the angonoka tortoise, which has a maximum straight carapace length of 51.9 cm (20.4 in). Though it is only known from a tibia, its mitochondrial genome shows deep genetic divergence, supporting its status as a distinct species.

== Ecology ==
In Ambolisatra, the presence of both A. rogerbouri and Aldabrachelys abrupta have been confirmed through genomic analysis of remains found at the site, confirming that the two species occurred in microsympatry. Additional remains from Ambolisatra have been morphologically referred to Aldabrachelys grandidieri and the extant radiated tortoise (Astrochelys radiata), but these records have not been genetically verified. The subfossil bones found in Ambolisatra assigned to Astrochelys radiata (as well as 3 other subfossil records of A. radiata and Astrochelys sp. outside the current range of the species) may represent Astrochelys rogerbouri. Though the remains identified as Aldabrachelys grandidieri from Ambolisatra are fragmentary and their assignment is questionable, Ambolisatra is geographically within the range of genetically confirmed Aldabrachelys grandidieri records, and the species may indeed have coexisted with Astrochelys rogerbouri there. Ambolisatra is also near the northwestern limit of the radiated tortoise's current range, and within the range of the extant spider tortoise (Pyxis arachnoides). In total, five tortoise species undoubtedly formerly lived in southwestern Madagascar (the spider tortoise, the two extinct Aldabrachelys species, the radiated tortoise and Astrochelys rogerbouri), an exceptional level of sympatric tortoise diversity.

Judging from the former sympatry of A. rogerbouri and the radiated tortoise, the two may have had different preferences in diet or habitat, and the angonoka tortoise may be hypothesized to have shared such preferences with A. rogerbouri.

== Extinction ==
It is unknown when A. rogerbouri became extinct, though it is believed to have survived until 1262 to 1069 years B.P. (between 761 and 954 AD) at least.
