= C11orf91 =

Protein

Identifiers
- Aliases: C11orf91, chromosome 11 open reading frame 91
- External IDs: MGI: 1915493; GeneCards: C11orf91

Gene location (Human)
Chr.	Chromosome 11 (human)
Band	11p13	Start	33,698,261 bp
Band	11p13	End	33,700,826 bp

Gene location (Mouse)
Chr.	Chromosome 2 (mouse)
Band	2|2 E2	Start	103,953,114 bp
Band	2|2 E2	End	103,955,094 bp
RNA expression pattern
Bgee	Human / Mouse (ortholog); Top expressed in: testicle; left testis; right testis; upper lobe of left lung; olfactory zone of nasal mucosa; right lung; gastric mucosa; minor salivary glands; gastrocnemius muscle; body of stomach / Top expressed in: spermatid; seminiferous tubule; zygote; spermatocyte; blastocyst; embryo; embryo; primary oocyte; secondary oocyte; neural layer of retina; More reference expression data
BioGPS	n/a
Orthologs
Databases	NCBI: entry; OMA: entry
Species	Human	Mouse
Entrez	100131378	68243
Ensembl	ENSG00000205177	ENSMUSG00000032671
UniProt	Q3C1V1	Q9D1Z2
RefSeq (mRNA)	NM_001166692	NM_026634
RefSeq (protein)	NP_001160164	NP_080910
Location (UCSC)	Chr 11: 33.7 – 33.7 Mb	Chr 2: 103.95 – 103.96 Mb
PubMed search
- Wikidata
View/Edit Human	View/Edit Mouse

Chromosome 11 open reading frame 91, or C11orf91 is a protein which in humans is encoded by the C11orf91 gene.

== Gene ==
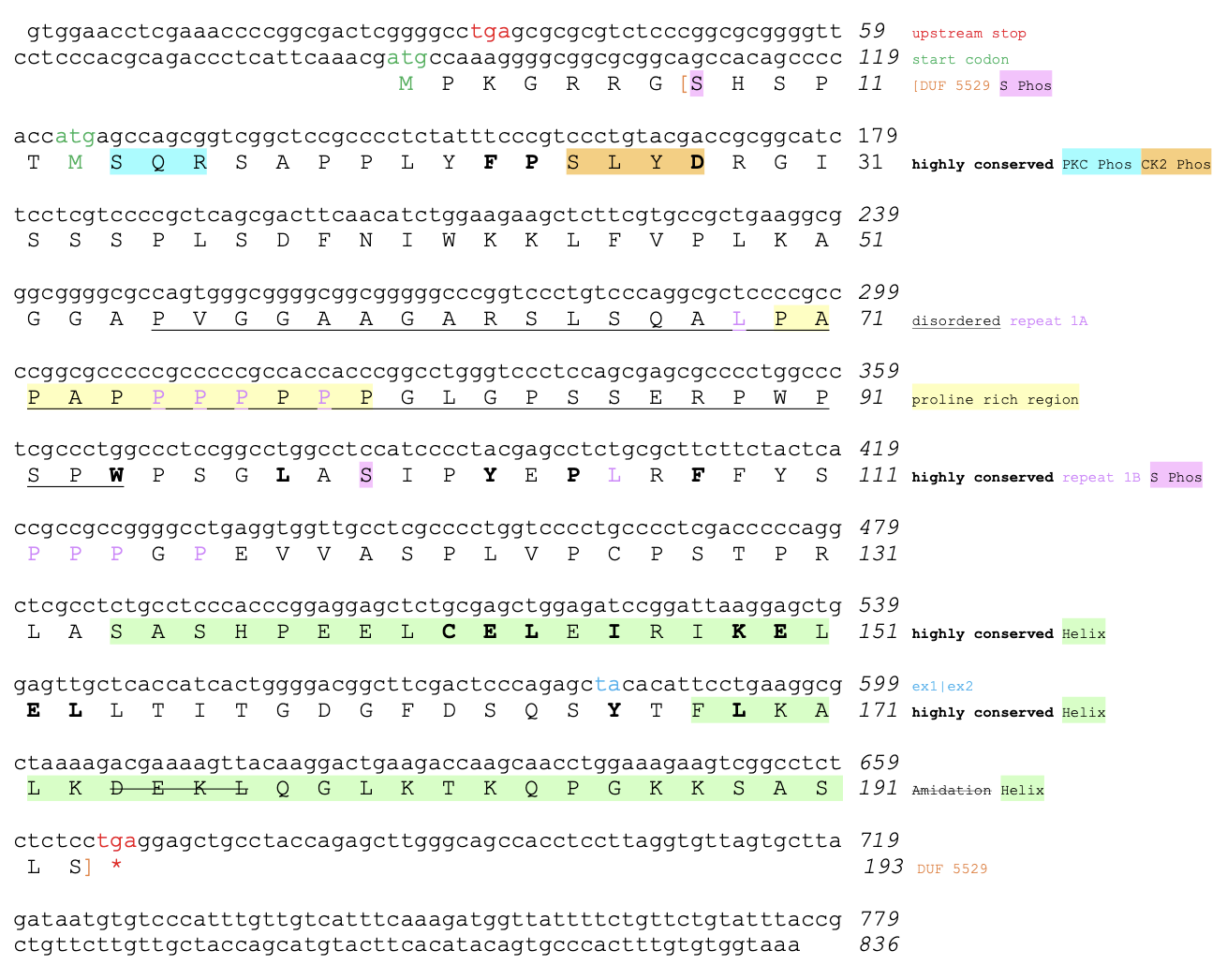
Conceptual translation of human C11orf91 gene/protein.

The C11orf91 gene consists of 5159 nucleotides with an mRNA of approximately 836 base pairs. There is one exon found in the C11orf91 gene.

== mRNA ==
The cytogenetic band location of C11orf91 is 11p13 and is located on the minus strand of the DNA .

=== Conceptual translation ===
Annotated depiction of the C11orf91 mRNA and amino acid protein sequences.

== Protein ==
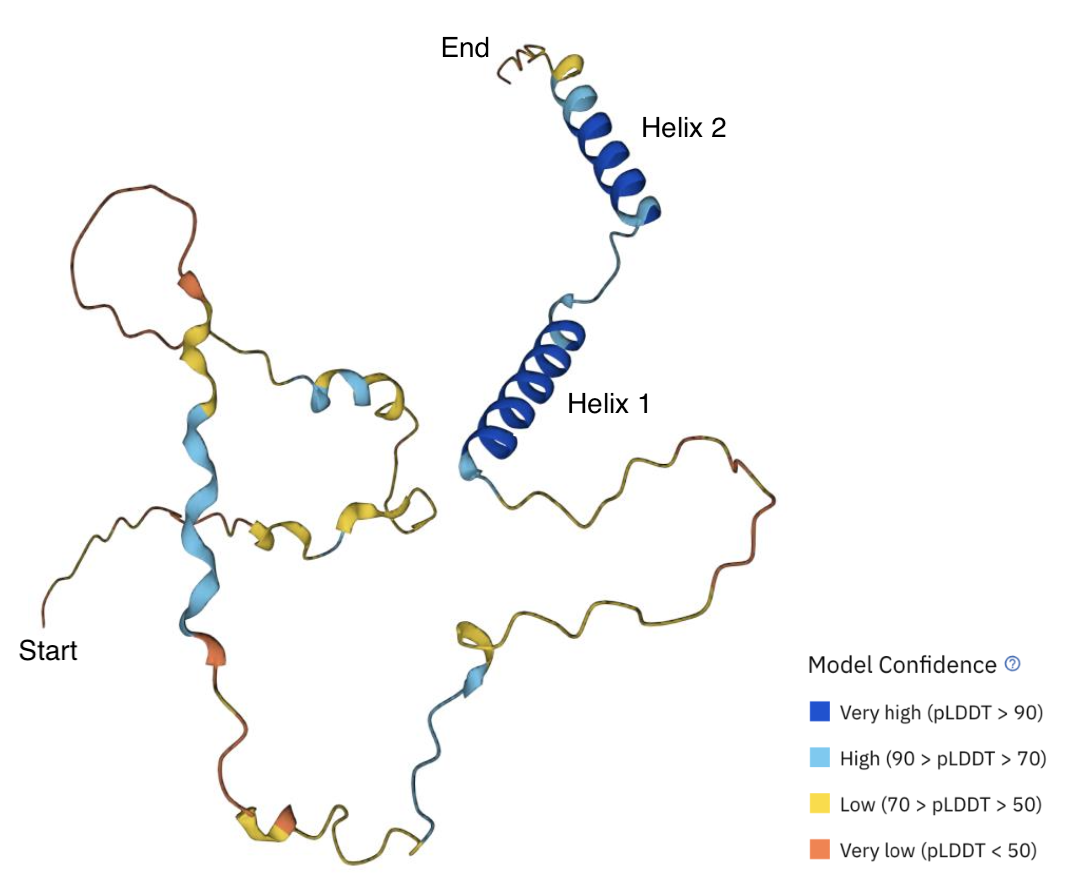
Tertiary Structure of human C11orf91 protein. Created with AlphaFold Protein Structure Database.

The C11orf91 gene encodes a protein that is 193 amino acids in length. The C11orf91 protein contains a domain of unknown function, DUF5529, that spans nearly the entire protein. RBMX protein binding sites were found to be highly conserved in several structures of human C11orf91 3'UTR and 5' UTR. C11orf91 is rich in serine and proline and poor in valine and asparagine. There is a proline rich region found in the middle of the C11orf91. The human C11orf91 protein is approximately 20 kDal and has an isoelectric point around 9.

=== Localization ===
Human C11orf91 protein is predicted to be localized in vesicles.

=== Structure ===
C11orf91 has two helices located near the C-terminus and no beta sheets.

=== Post-translational modifications ===
C11orf91 has a predicted Protein kinase C (PKC) phosphorylation site, Casein kinase 2 (CK2) phosphorylation site, amidation site, and two predicted serine phosphorylation sites, see Conceptual Translation for post-translational modification site locations.

== Evolution ==
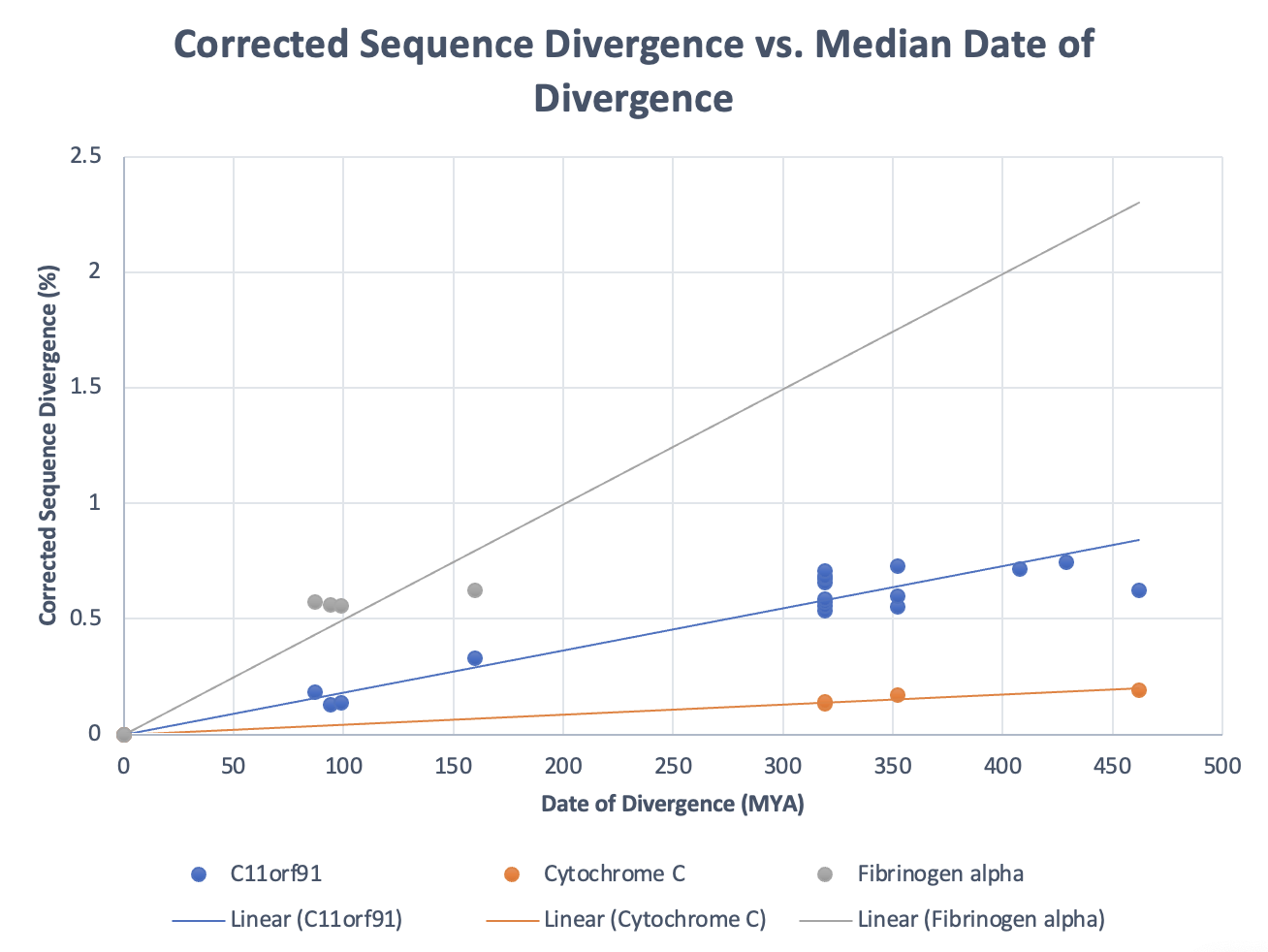
Corrected Sequence Divergence vs. Median Date of Divergence graph for human C11orf91, Fibrinogen Alpha, and Cytochrome C.

There are no paralogs of the human C11orf91 protein. The human C11orf91 protein has several orthologs found across eight categories of jawed vertebrates including: aves, testudines, alligators, reptiles, mammals, amphibians, lungfishes, and cartilaginous fishes.

Select Orthologs of C11orf91
Genus and species	Common name	Taxonomic group	Median Date of Divergence (MYA)	Accession number	Sequence length (aa)	Sequence identity to human protein (%) ! !Sequence similarity to Human Protein (%)	
Homo sapiens	Human	Primates	0	XP_016872542.1	193	100	100
Mus musculus	Mouse	Rodentia	87	NP_080910.1	194	81.7	84.3
Equus caballus	Horse	Odd-toed ungulates	94	XP_023509601.1	191	87	89.1
Choloepus didactylus	Southern two-toed sloth	Pilosa	99	XP_037697448.1	191	86.2	87.2
Phascolarctos cinereus	Koala	Diprotodontia	160	XP_020819588.1	212	67.1	70.8
Gopherus evgoodei	Goode's thornscrub tortoise	Testudines	319	XP_030417986.1	163	46.5	55.5
Pogona vitticeps	Central bearded dragon	Squamata	319	XP_020663275.1	168	44.3	54.7
Sphaerodactylus townsendi	Townsend's least gecko	Squamata	319	XP_048340539.1	168	43	51.7
Alligator mississippiensis	American alligator	Crocodilia	319	XP_059577366.1	157	41.4	51.2
Tyto alba	Barn owl	Strigiformes	319	XP_042641164.1	143	34.5	41.5
Calypte anna	Hummingbird	Apodiformes	319	XP_030307391.1	146	32.3	44.6
Gymnogyps californianus	California condor	Accipitriformes	319	XP_050754406.1	142	32.2	38.8
Dryobates pubescens	Downy woodpecker	Piciformes	319	XP_054027854.1	143	32.1	43.5
Dromaius novaehollandiae	Emu	Struthioniformes	319	XP_025967391.1	209	29.6	35.8
Rhinatrema bivittatum	Two-lined caecilians	Caecilidae	352	XP_029438087.1	144	45.1	57
Pleurodeles waltl	Iberian ribbed newt	Caudata	352	KAJ1177600.1	140	40.1	52.3
Hyla sarda	Sardinian tree frog	Anura	352	XP_056384394.1	153	27.4	37
Protopterus annectens	West African lungfish	Lepidosireniformes	408	XP_043915714.1	173	28.5	37.4
Pygocentrus nattereri	Red-bellied piranha	Characiformes	429	XP_017546298.1	147	25.9	37.1
Amblyraja radiata	Thorny skate	Rajiformes	462	XP_032894439.1	136	37.7	46.2
