= Hole (musical) =

2025 American musical

HOLE! is a two-person musical written and acted by the team Jake Brasch and Nadja Leonhard-Hooper, a duo known as American Sing-Song (A.S.S.). It is directed by RJ Tolan.

== Production ==
HOLE! has been performed at Joe's Pub in New York City, Soho Theatre in London, and Edinburgh Fringe Festival in 2025 and 2026. A full production will open Off-Broadway at Playwrights Horizons for the 2026-27 season.

== Reception ==
The musical has built a passionate fanbase through word of mouth, selling out shows at Edinburgh Fringe Festival.
