= Serge Becker =

Swiss creative director and nightlife designer (born 1961)

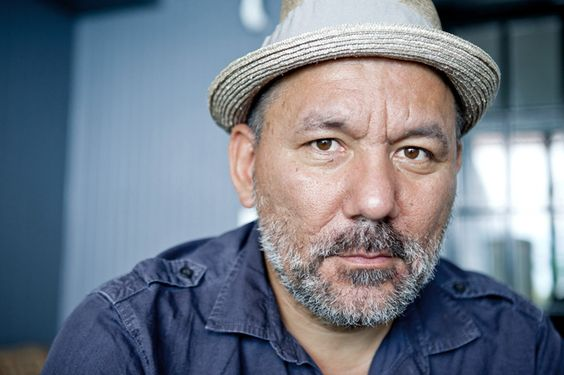
- Serge Becker
- Born: 1961 (age 64–65); Paris, France
- Education: Kunstgewerbeschule Zürich
- Occupations: Creative director, nightlife & restaurant designer, impresario

Serge Becker (born 1961 in Paris) is a Swiss creative director, nightlife and hospitality designer, and impresario. He is part of a second wave of New York City restaurateurs who incorporated nightlife and theatrical elements into their venues. André Balazs described Becker as a "Cultural Engineer" in the New York Times.

== Biography ==
Becker was born in Paris in 1961 and raised in Zürich from age 8. He is the son of Ruth Becker, a Swiss theater and television administrator, and a Vietnamese father. He studied graphic design at Kunstgewerbeschule Zürich from 1977 to 1982.

While studying, he worked nights as a DJ at local clubs. With photographer Pietro Mattioli, he selected records at one of Zürich's early punk evenings, documented in the book 1977. In the early 1980s he began booking New York City rap performers including Kurtis Blow, Davey D, and Grandmaster DST for Swiss audiences.

Becker moved to New York City in 1982 and became art director at the nightclub AREA, a position he held for three years. This led to a 15-year creative partnership with AREA co-founder Eric Goode. Together, they designed and operated New York City clubs and restaurants, directed music videos, and produced art and photography.

In 1998, Becker joined George C. Wolfe, Josh Pickard, and Paul Salmon to open Joe's Pub at The Public Theater. The same year, he started the design firm Can Resources with architect Derek Sanders and creative director Lisa Ano. The firm designed commercial and residential projects, including the Flower Box Building in the East Village.

In 2000, Ano and Becker launched List, a magazine presenting all content in list format. Both the magazine and Can Resources closed after the dot-com bubble crash and 9/11.

In 2004, Becker and Sanders joined artists Thomas Sandbichler and Jeff Gompertz to open the multimedia art club Volume in North Williamsburg, Brooklyn. In 2005, Becker and Sanders opened the Mexican restaurant and bar La Esquina.

In 2007, Becker joined Simon Hammerstein and Richard Kimmel to open the Neo-Burlesque theater The Box. In 2008, he opened Café Select with Oliver Stumm and Dominique Clausen.

In 2011, Becker partnered with Paul Salmon, brothers Binn and Genc Jakupi, and Meriem Soliman to open the Jamaican restaurant Miss Lily's. In 2012, he opened La Bodega Negra in London with restaurateur Will Ricker and Eddie Spencer Churchill.

In 2016, Becker was appointed creative and artistic director of the Museum of Sex in New York. He oversaw the museum's expansion to two buildings and eight galleries, and led the design and curation of "Superfunland", an immersive exhibition that opened in late 2019.

== Nightclubs, restaurants, and hotels ==
- 1983–1987: AREA Nightclub
- 1988: MK Nightclub with Eric Goode, Jennifer Goode, André Balazs, Katie Ford, Aby Rosen, Michael Fuchs
- 1989: BC Nightclub in Los Angeles with Eric Goode, André Balazs, Bret Witke
- 1990: Time Café and Fez with Eric Goode, Josh Pickard, Aby Rosen, Michael Fuchs
- 1992: Club USA with Eric Goode for Peter Gatien
- 1992: Tunnel Nightclub with Eric Goode for Peter Gatien
- 1992: The Mercer Hotel master plan with André Balazs
- 1994: B Bar & Grill with Eric Goode
- 1994: Jones Hollywood for Sean MacPherson
- 1994: Good Luck Bar for Sean MacPherson
- 1998: Joe's Pub at The Public Theater with Josh Pickard, Paul Salmon, Kevin Abbott
- 2004: Volume Club with Thomas Sandbichler, Jeff Gompertz, Derek Sanders
- 2004: Lure Fishbar for John McDonald, Josh Pickard, Josh Capon
- 2005: La Esquina Restaurant with Derek Sanders, Ily Hümer, Cordell Lochin, James Gersten
- 2007: The Box with Simon Hammerstein, Richard Kimmel, Randy Weiner
- 2008: Café Select with Oliver Stumm, Dominique Clausen
- 2011: Miss Lily's Soho with Paul Salmon, Binn Jakupi, Genc Jakupi, Meriem Soliman
- 2012: Bodega Negra London with Will Ricker, Eddie Spencer Churchill
- 2013: Miss Lily's 7A
- 2014: Bodega Negra New York with Noah Teppenberg and Strategic Group
- 2015: Miss Lily's Dubai with Varun Khemaney, Khalil Damash
- 2018: Alley Cat Amateur Theatre at Beekman Hotel with Tom Colicchio
- 2018: Miss Lily's Negril at Skylark Hotel for Paul Salmon
- 2019: Bodega Negra Doha with Will Ricker
- 2019: Indochine Dubai with Jean Marc Houmard, Varun Khemaney, Khalil Damash
- 2021: LMNO Philadelphia with Stephen Starr

== Museums and galleries ==
- 2009: Swiss Institute New York, Design of Sculptural Reading Room
- 2013: "AREA: The Exhibition", Group Show, The Hole Gallery, curated by Jeffrey Deitch and Glenn O'Brien; Production Design
- 2016–2020: Creative and Artistic Director Museum of Sex, New York; Overseeing program, design and execution In collaboration with curator Lissa Rivera and founder Dan Gluck

== Exhibitions ==
- 2016: "Night Fever" New York Disco 1977–1979 The Bill Bernstein Photographs
- 2016: "Sex Lives of Animals"
- 2017: "Known/ Unknown" Private Obsession and Hidden Desire in Outsider Art
- 2017: "NSFW – Female Gaze"
- 2017: "Canon" Juan José Barboza-Gubo & Andrew Mroczek
- 2017: "Zana Bayne" Stage Costume Anthology
- 2017: "Celestial Bodies" the Couples Virtual Reality Experience with Diplo
- 2018: "The Incomplete Araki" Life and Death in the Work of Nobuyoshi Araki
- 2018: "Leonor Fini" Theatre of Desire 1930–1990
- 2018: "Punk Lust" Raw Provocation 1971–1985
- 2019: "Stag": The Illicit Origins of Pornographic Film
- 2019: "Mariette Pathy Allen" Rites of Passage 1978–2006
- 2019: "James Bidgood" Reveries
- 2019: "Superfunland" Journey into the Erotic Carnival

== Publications ==
- 2000: List Magazine an anthology of lists with co-editor Lisa Ano

== Art direction and production design ==
- 1992: "I'm a Frayed Knot" (Gary Indiana) Rivington Theatre; Production design
- 1993: Dido and Aeneas opera at the Academy; Production design
- 2002: "60 Years Capitol Records" campaign; Creative direction

== Music videos and film direction ==
- 1992: Nine Inch Nails – "Help Me, I'm in Hell"
- 1992: Nine Inch Nails – "Pinion"
- 1993: MTV – "Alternative Nation" title sequence
- 1993: Digital Orgasm – "Time to Believe"
- 1994: CeCe Peniston – "Hit by Love"
- 1994: Messiah – "I Feel Love"
- 1994: Terrorvision – "Oblivion"
- 1998: Robbie Robertson – "Unbound"
- 2019: "The Origins of the Fair" – A Panoramic History with Lissa Rivera
