= Zollar =

Zollar may mean:

- Jawole Willa Jo Zollar
- Zimbabwe RTGS Dollar
