= Association of Performing Arts Professionals =

U.S. nonprofit organization

The Association of Performing Arts Professionals (previously the Association of Performing Arts Presenters, also known as APAP), based in Washington, D.C., is one of the leading groups to provide networking and advocacy for the performing arts presenting sector. They conduct programs to help professional development and provide resources to help members network and find funding sources. More than 1600 organizations are members.

APAP convenes an annual five day convention called APAP|NYC every January in New York City in which presenters, managers, artists and others participate in talks, displays, and other forums to share information and create programs.

Founded in 1957, APAP is a 501(c)(3) organization governed by a volunteer board of directors. Since 2020 the President and CEO is Lisa Richards Toney.

== History ==
APAP's story begins in the 1950s when college and university concert managers directed their interests toward the educational role of the arts and the unique issues related to professional performing arts on campus. Fan Taylor, presenter at the Wisconsin Union Theater, became the founder of APAP. The University of Wisconsin in Madison initially housed the staff.

During the 1960s and 1970s, the presenting field and membership expanded to a variety of organizations, prompting the association to change its name to the Association of College, University and Community Arts Administrators (ACUCAA) in 1973. By the mid-1980s, colleges and universities no longer dominated the membership, and the association's spectrum expanded. The organization's name was changed to the Association of Performing Arts Presenters in 1988.

Fan Taylor led the organization for 24 years, beginning in 1947. Bill Dawson succeeded Taylor in 1971 and served until 1986, when Susie Farr became the third executive director until her departure in 1999. During her tenure the national office relocated to Washington, D.C. Sandra Gibson served as president and CEO from 2000 until 2011. In October 2011, the board of directors appointed Mario Garcia Durham as president and CEO, the fifth leader of APAP. Since 2020 Lisa Richards Toney has been president and CEO.

== Membership ==
Membership in the association was 29 in 1957; today, APAP has 1,600 organizational and individual members and serves more than 5,000 performing arts professionals every year.According to an interview with Mario Garcia Durham 50% of the members are presenting organizations, 47% are artists, managers, agents, producers or creative producers and the rest are other types of arts constituents (consultants, vendors, service organizations etc.).

The association represents the nonprofit and for-profit sectors of the presenting and touring industry of the performing arts in the U.S. and internationally, with member organizations from all 50 U.S. states and at least 50 countries. Members include large performing arts centers in major cities, outdoor festivals, rural community-focused organizations, academic institutions, individual artists, and artist managers and booking agents. Members represent multiple disciplines including various forms of dance, music, theater, puppetry, circus, magic, attractions and performance art.

== Programs ==
APAP supports its members through professional development programs and resource, supporting its work through grants, resources, and advocacy. APAP programs focus on broadening the impact of the performing arts to all audiences and to all citizens. As a founding member of the Performing Arts Alliance, APAP advocates for national policies that support, strengthen and improve the performing arts industry.

=== APAP|NYC ===
The association holds an annual members-only conference in New York City every January called APAP|NYC, the world's leading gathering of performing arts professionals. A core component of this five-day-long event is professional development, with more than 80 sessions, including artist showcase sessions, pre-conference seminars, individual consultations, and plenary events with featured guest speakers.

With so many artists convening in one place at one time, several other festivals take place around the same time, among them the Chamber Music American, Global Fest, Winter Jazzfest, Prototype, and afterwards the International Society for the Performing Arts. Several festivals, COIL, Under the Radar, and American Realness which had participated, no longer do.

=== Professional development ===
Through professional development programs and resources, APAP helps artists, agents, managers, presenters and producers to gain the knowledge, skills and strategies they need to make the arts a vibrant, valuable and sustainable part of everyday life. APAP provides year-round resources for Professional Development and Networking including access to the Membership Database, joining Fellowship programs, and monthly webinars.

=== Leadership programs ===
Two of the programs take place at APAP|NYC:

Emerging Leadership Institute (Eli): Annual two-day intensive seminar for cohort of 20–30 emerging leaders that takes place at APAP|NYC.

Young Performers Career Advancement (YPCA): Taking place at APAP|NYC, the Young Performers Career Advancement Program (YPCA) is a series of intensive seminars designed to support classical musicians in the formative stages of their careers by offering opportunities to meet and work with established presenters, managers, agents and artists.

The other two take place at other times of the year.

Leadership Fellows Program (LFP): Leadership Fellows Program (LFP) is a 20-month-long program for mid-career professionals.

National Dance Presenters Forum (NDPF) a four-day program for dance presenters to discuss emerging issues. It is conducted in conjunction with Jacob's Pillow, Dance/USA, and New England Foundation for the Arts (NEFA).

=== Grant programs ===
APAP offers several grant programs exclusively for APAP members to provide financial support that recognizes outstanding and innovative practice.

Building Bridges: Building Bridges is a program that supports campus based presenters interested in building interdisciplinary cross campus and community collaborations that expand knowledge and understanding of Muslim societies.

Cultural Exchange Fund: The Cultural Exchange Fund is a travel subsidy program to assist U.S. based presenting professionals and artists in building partnerships and collaborations with international colleagues and to experience the work of artists from around the world in its cultural context.

== Awards ==
APAP has been honoring major figures with awards for many decades. They present these annual awards at the annual APAP|NYC conference to recognize innovators and visionaries of the performing arts field.

- The Award of Merit - for ingenuity that have had a lasting effort and may have reinvented an art form.
- The Fan Taylor Distinguished Service Award - In memory of Fan Taylor, one of the founders, for impact in the area of presenting, booking and touring or on the organization itself.
- The William Dawson Award - In honor of William M. Dawson, an early director of APAP, for an innovator in community affairs, arts administration, and innovation in programming.
- The Sidney R. Yates Advocacy Award - In memory of Congressman Sidney R. Yates, for an advocacy effort that has had a major impact in the field.
- The Spark of Change Award - Honors someone younger than 40 or a new group with fewer than 15 years of performance who has demonstrated groundbreaking advances in the areas of production, booking and touring field. Awarded as of 2024.
- The Arts Champion Award - Recognition of dedication to APAP through financial support and leadership of the performing arts. Awarded as of 2024.
- CIPA Award for Outstanding Achievement in Creative Producing - Awarded in conjunction with The Creative and Independent Producer Alliance (CIPA) to creative producers in the US who have had a major impact in this field. Awarded since 2022.

The most recent awardees:

Year	Merit Award	Sidney R. Yates Advocacy Award	Fan Taylor Distinguished Service Award	William Dawson Award for Programmatic Excellence	Spark of Change Award	Arts Champion Award	CIPA Award for Outstanding Achievement in Creative Producing
2026	Cleo Parker Robinson	Matthew Covey	Renae Williams Niles	Alicia B. Adams	Samora Pinderhughes	Colleen Jennings-Roggensack	Emma Orme
2025	Nona Hendryx	Lulani Arquette	Pamela Tatge	Afa Dworkin	Terell Johnson	Halsey (posthumous) and Alice North	Ben Grinberg
2024	Terence Blanchard	Randy Cohen	Lisa Booth-posthumous and Deirdre Valente (Lisa Booth Management)	Shanta Thake	Ruby Morales	John W. Brown and Rosemary Kopel Brown	Claudia Norman
2022	Jawole Willa Jo Zollar	Lori Lea Pourier	Janet Cowperthwaite	YoungArts (Sarah Arison, Board Chair)			Torya Beard
2021	Toshi Reagon	NIVA National Independent Venue Association (Dayna Frank,and Rev.Moose)	Mario Garcia Durham	The Public Theater (Oskar Eustis, Patrick Willingham )			

== Comments about APAP ==
Jawole Willa Jo Zollar, Choreographer and Professor of Fine Arts at Florida State University and recipient of the 2022 Award of Merit said, upon receipt of the prize, “APAP is a very special organization to me. When Urban Bush Women was at the lowest point in its nearly 40-year career, it was really the presenting community that kept Urban Bush Women alive. I have so much gratitude to be honored by this community.”
