= Area (nightclub) =

Former Manhattan nightclub (1983–1987)

Coordinates: 40°43′18″N 74°00′31″W

Area was a themed nightclub that operated from 1983 to 1987 at 157 Hudson Street in Manhattan, New York City. It was a hot spot for celebrities and luminaries of the New York art scene. The club was known for its unusual invitations and changing themes.

Area was founded by brothers Eric Goode and Christopher Goode, Shawn Hausman, Darius Azari, and Zwi Wasserstein. The life of the club is chronicled in the book Area: 1983-1987 (2013) by Eric and Jennifer Goode.

== History ==
The brick building housing Area was originally built in 1866 to house the stables of American Express.

From its inception, the club became known for its creative invitations. 5,000 invitations were sent in capsules for the September 1983 opening. They sent champagne-bottle crackers for New Year's Eve, hollowed-out eggs for Natural History, and black handkerchiefs for Halloween.

The club was opened on Mondays and Wednesday through Saturday. The themed decors changed every six weeks with themes such as Art, Confinement, Suburbia, and Science Fiction that incorporated elaborate installations. Serge Becker was the art director. Their art department also consisted of Jennifer Goode, Michael Staats, Kenny Baird.

Ben Buchanan was the official photographer for the club and was there most nights documenting the scene. These photos were in Details every month and often in the New York Post and Daily News.

Area attracted many celebrities such as Grace Jones, Andy Warhol, Malcolm Forbes, and Jean-Michel Basquiat. There are several mentions of Area in The Andy Warhol Diaries. Michael Musto, writing for Details magazine and The Village Voice respectively, chronicled the doings there. Musto's book, Downtown looked back on the phenomenon. In February 1985, Pulitzer Prize-winning playwright Jonathan Larson conceived of his unpublished musical Superbia while in Area's projectionist's booth.

By early 1987, Area had closed. Of the "three hot clubs" in lower Manhattan in the 1980s—Area, Limelight, and Danceteria - Area "[died] a natural death", Limelight survived with a less artistic clientele, and Danceteria "[gave] way to expensive office space," said Musto.

After the gentrification of the neighborhood, the building was renovated by Kevin Kennon Architects to multifamily residential use, with terraced penthouses atop the existing structure.
