= Shanta Thake =

Shanta Thake is the Chief Artistic Officer of Lincoln Center for the Performing Arts, charged with expanding Lincoln Center's cultural reach within New York City. Thake launched the organization’s Summer for the City Festival in 2022, which brings live programming across Lincoln Center’s campus to 10 stages. Under her leadership, Lincoln Center has significantly increased the organization's free and Choose-What-You-Pay ticketing for all their programming. Thake's influence has led to regular collaborations with Lincoln Center’s resident organizations, including the first ever cross-campus celebration of a single artist, Terence Blanchard.

Before taking the Lincoln Center position in September 2021, she was Associate Artistic Director/ Director of Artistic Programs at The Public Theater. In this capacity, Thake oversaw the growth and development of Public Works, Mobile Unit, Under the Radar, Joe's Pub, The Shakespeare Initiative and Public Forum. Previously, she spent 10 years as the Director of Joe's Pub at The Public, The Public Theater's cabaret space named after Theater founder Joseph Papp. Under Thake's direction, Joe's Pub produced events at The Delacorte Theater in Central Park and in collaboration with Make Music New York, Under The Radar and DanceNOW, among other organizations.

In 2011, Thake established New York Voices, a commission program that provides musicians with tools to develop original theater works. Recipients include Ethan Lipton, whose 2011 New York Voices debut No Place To Go went on to win an Obie Award, (Off-Broadway Theater Award). Other commissioned artists include Toshi Reagon, Bridget Everett, Allen Toussaint and more.

Thake also serves as one of three producers of globalFEST, a world music festival and non-profit organization. The organization has curated stages at Webster Hall, Bonnaroo, SXSW and Festival d’Ile de France and administers a touring fund to world music artists touring new markets in North America.

Thake acted as board chair for the theater company Waterwell, was the co-creator of Weimar New York and is an active member of the Middle Collegiate Church Jerriese Johnson Gospel Choir. Thake has been the recipient of the Association of Performing Arts Presenters Emerging Leader award, APAP's 2024 William Dawson Award for Programmatic Excellence and Sustained Achievement in Programming, and the Theater Communications Group’s Leaders of Color grant. She received a BA in Theater as well as a degree in management from Indiana University Bloomington and currently lives in Brooklyn.
