= Amphisbaena townsendi =

Scientific classification
- Kingdom: Animalia
- Phylum: Chordata
- Class: Reptilia
- Order: Squamata
- Clade: Amphisbaenia
- Family: Amphisbaenidae
- Genus: Amphisbaena
- Species: A. townsendi

Binomial name
- Amphisbaena townsendi Stejneger, 1911

Synonyms
- Amphisbaena townsendi Stejneger, 1911; Amphisbaena occidentalis townsendi — J. Peters, Donoso-Barros & Orejas-Miranda, 1970; Amphisbaena townsendi — Gans, 2005

Species of lizard

Amphisbaena townsendi is a species of amphibaenian in the family Amphisbaenidae. The species is endemic to Peru.

== Etymology ==
The specific name, townsendi, is in honor of American zoologist Charles Haskins Townsend.

== Description ==
The holotype of A. townsendi has a snout-to-vent length (SVL) of 20.6 cm (8.1 in), a tail length of 2.1 cm (0.83 in), and a body diameter of 0.5 cm (0.20 in).

== Reproduction ==
A. townsendi is oviparous.
