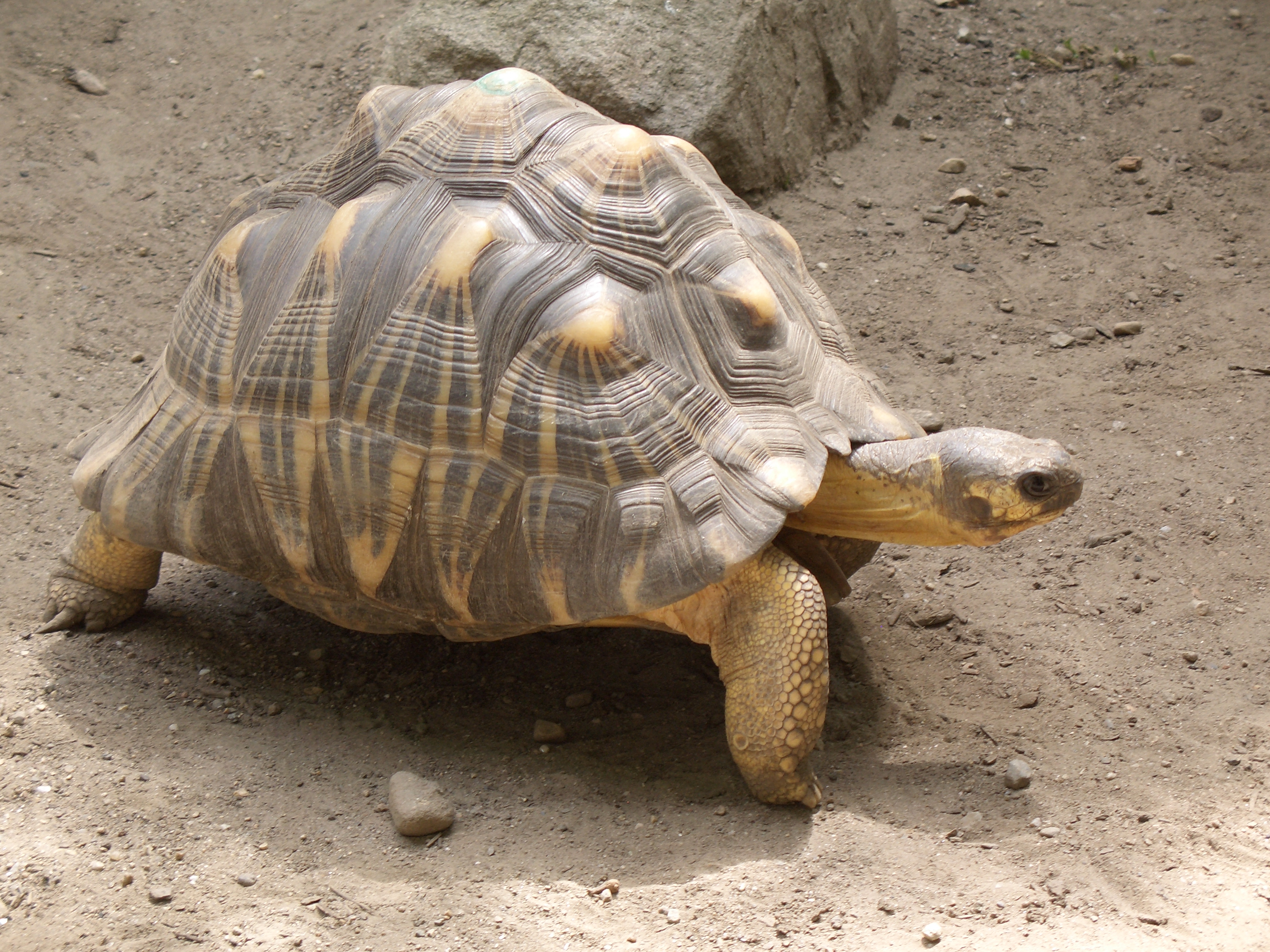
- Astrochelys radiata

Scientific classification
- Kingdom: Animalia
- Phylum: Chordata
- Class: Reptilia
- Order: Testudines
- Suborder: Cryptodira
- Family: Testudinidae
- Genus: Astrochelys; J. E. Gray, 1873

Species
- Astrochelys radiata; Astrochelys rogerbouri; Astrochelys yniphora

= Astrochelys =

Genus of tortoises

Astrochelys is a genus of tortoises in the family Testudinidae. The two species are both found in Madagascar, and both classified as critically endangered on the IUCN Red List.

== Species ==
Image	Common name	Scientific name	Distribution
	Angonoka tortoise or ploughshare tortoise	Astrochelys yniphora	northwestern Madagascar
	Radiated tortoise	Astrochelys radiata	southern Madagascar; introduced to Réunion and Mauritius

A single extinct species was described in 2023: Astrochelys rogerbouri.
