= Charles Haskins Townsend =

American zoologist (1859–1944)

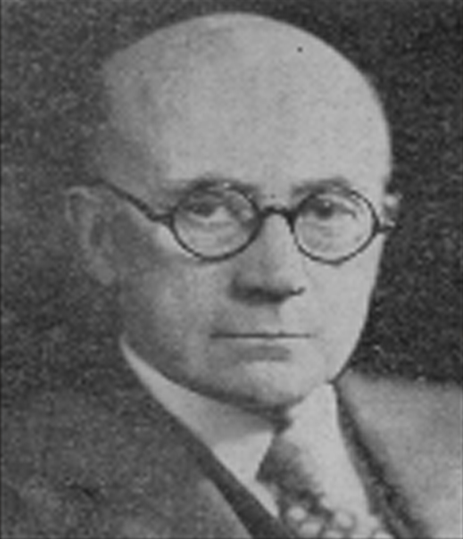
- Born: September 29, 1859; Parnassus, Pennsylvania, U.S.
- Died: January 28, 1944 (aged 84); Miami, Florida
- Education: Academy of Natural Sciences of Philadelphia
- Spouse(s): Ella Townsend, nee Bean, (1854–1935)
- Scientific career
- Fields: Zoology
- Workplaces: United States Fish Commission; New York Aquarium

Charles Haskins Townsend (September 29, 1859 – January 28, 1944) was an American zoologist and naturalist who served as the director of the New York Aquarium, from 1902 to 1937.

In 1928 and 1933, Townsend led two expeditions to the Galapagos islands, to save the Galapagos tortoise from extinction. Townsend collected nearly two-hundred samples of the tortoise, and brought them home to New York. Townsend established over a dozen breeding colonies for the tortoise. These colonies were later used to repopulate the tortoises on the Galapagos islands.

== Early life ==
The son of the Reverend Daniel W. Townsend and Elizabeth Townsend, née Kier, he was born in Parnassus, Pennsylvania, and educated in public and private schools. He was a graduate of the Academy of Natural Sciences of Philadelphia. He subsequently worked at the Smithsonian Institution.

== Career ==
In 1883, he became assistant United States Fish Commissioner in charge of salmon propagation in California. For a time, he was in charge of deep-sea explorations on the USS Albatross. From 1897 to 1902, he served as chief of the Fish Commission's fisheries division. He then served as director of the New York Aquarium at Castle Garden, from 1902 until his retirement in 1937.

== Efforts to Save the Galapagos Tortoise ==
During the 1920s, Townsend became concerned about the declining populations of Galápagos tortoises. He warned of their impending extinction in a 1926 article published in the New York Zoological Society Bulletin.

Townsend decided to do what he could to save the animals. In 1928, Townsend led a New York Zoological Society expedition to the Galápagos Islands. During this expedition, he collected 182 tortoises.

On April 22, 1928, Townsend brought 108 Galapagos tortoises from the Galapagos islands to Balboa, Panama. At that time, the tortoises were already extinct in ten of the twelve islands of the Galapagos group of islands, in Ecuador.

Townsend shipped about 100 of the tortoises from Panama to New York. Twenty-three of the animals went to the Bronx Zoo. Townsend used the remaining tortoises to establish breeding colonies of the tortoises in Puerto Rico, Florida, Texas and San Diego, California.

Townsend led a second expedition to the Galapagos islands in 1933, to save what was left of the tortoises. He eventually shipped the animals to more than a dozen locations around the world.

Nearly a century later, the descendants of tortoises collected by Townsend remain at locations such as the Bronx Zoo. One animal collected during Townsend’s expeditions, thought to be more than 100 years in age, was sent from the San Diego Zoo back to the Galapagos to help repopulate the island of Española.

On November 20, 2025, one of the last surviving tortoises from Townsend's expeditions died at the San Diego zoo. The tortoise, known as "Gramma," lived to be an estimated 141 years of age.

== Memberships and honors ==
In 1902 Townsend was an expert before the Russo-American fisheries arbitration at The Hague. In 1912-13 he was president of the American Fisheries Society. He was elected a fellow of the New York Academy of Sciences.

He is commemorated in the names of Townsend's shearwater, Townsend's big-eared bat and the Guadalupe fur seal (Arctophoca townsendi).

He is also commemorated in the scientific names of three species of reptiles: Amphisbaena townsendi, Anolis townsendi, and Sphaerodactylus townsendi.

== Writing ==
He wrote extensively on fisheries, whaling, fur seals, deep-sea exploration and zoology, including ornithology and herpetology. With Hugh McCormick Smith he wrote The Pacific Salmons section of Trout and Salmon (New York: Macmillan, 1902), a volume of Caspar Whitney's prestigious American Sportsman's Library.

In 1925, Townsend published a study of 19th century logbooks of whaling ships, to determine how many Galapagos tortoises were taken from the Galapagos islands. Between 1831 and 1868, seventy-nine whaling vessels made 189 calls at the islands. During these stops, these vessels removed an estimated 13,013 Galapagos tortoises from the islands. The article was published by the New York Zoological Society in its official journal.

== Selected publications ==
- Report of the Cruise of the Revenue Marine Steamer 'Corwin' in the Arctic Ocean in 1885 (1887)
- Porpoise in Captivity (1914)
- The Galapagos Tortoises in Their Relation to the Whaling Industry (1926)
- The Public Aquarium: Its Construction, Equipment and Management (1928)
- Guide to the New York Aquarium (1937)

== See also ==
- Category:Taxa named by Charles Henry Tyler Townsend
- Ida May Mellen, secretary to Charles Haskins Townsend, 1916 to 1929; pioneering female ichthyologist
