= Joe's Pub =

Performance space in New York City

Coordinates: 40.729259°N 73.991772°W

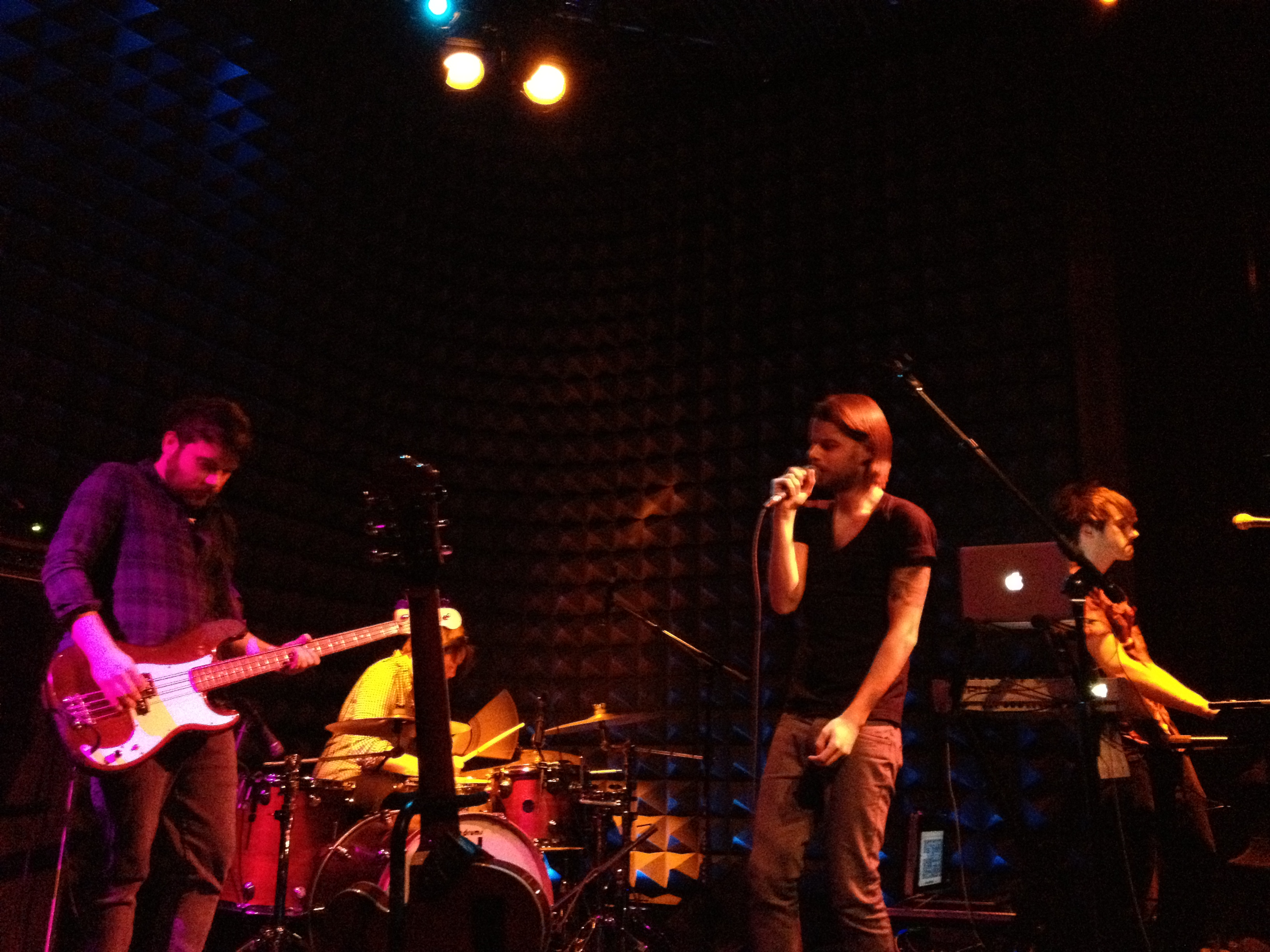
- Song of Return performing at Joe's Pub in 2012
- Interactive map of Joe's Pub
- Address: 425 Lafayette Street; New York City, NY 10003-7021
- Location: East Village, Lower Manhattan
- Owner: The Public Theater
- Capacity: 184

Construction
- Opened: October 16, 1998 (28 years ago)
- Cost: $2.35 million

Website
- www.joespub.com

Joe's Pub, one of the six performance spaces within The Public Theater, is a music venue and restaurant that hosts live performances across genres and arts, ranging from cabaret to modern dance to world music. It is located at the Astor Library Building at 425 Lafayette Street near Astor Place in Manhattan, New York City. It is named after Joseph Papp, the theatrical producer who established the New York Shakespeare Festival, The Public Theater and the free Shakespeare in the Park program in Central Park.

The venue hosted Amy Winehouse and Adele as they made their U.S. headlining concert debuts. In 2013, its 15th anniversary year, it was declared one of Rolling Stone Magazine's 10 Best Clubs in America.

== History ==
Joe's Pub opened on October 16, 1998, with an inaugural concert performed by Carl Hancock Rux. Soon after, a reviewer for The New York Times wrote "You enter through the side door of the Joseph Papp Public Theater. Farther south on Lafayette Street, revolving doors admit patrons to the Public's various theatrical spaces, but here, on the outskirts, an iron-fenced portal offers entree to the theater's new nightclub." He continued, "But Joe's Pub is a much less lofty enterprise, carved as it is from ground-floor back-office space at the theater." The $2.35 million club is the result, in part, of a construction and renovation grant to the Public from city capital funds that includes refurbishment of the Delacorte Theater in Central Park. There were some doubters when the club opened in October who wondered whether the Public Theater could make a theater-night life alliance work. Six months later, according to George C. Wolfe, the then-producer of the Public, Joe's Pub "is actually doing better than I thought it would." He continued to say, "The club's programming is idiosyncratic: from ethnic music ensembles to spoken-word artists to the most promising young musical-theater composers and performers on the contemporary scene, the changing roster has generated an after-hours theatricality all its own."

The Pub is known as one of New York City's live showcase venues, catering to an eclectic mix of music genres. The variety of the Pub's entertainment was the vision of Public Theater Associate Producer Bonnie Metzgar and principal booking agent Bill Bragin. Bragin established relationships with artists that have made Joe's Pub popular with local, domestic, and international acts. In 2007, Bragin left Joe's Pub to work for Lincoln Center, and Shanta Thake was unanimously given the head-booker position by the board of the Public Theater. Thake served as the Director of Joe's Pub until 2018, when Alex Knowlton, who had been with Joe's Pub in various roles since 2009, took over as Director.

In 2011, the Pub, along with the rest of The Public's Astor Library Building, received a top-to-bottom renovation, leading to improved sight lines, expanded seating capacity and a new food and beverage partnership with Chef Andrew Carmellini.

== Venue ==
The venue is equipped with theater-quality lighting and sound. During its formative years, the sound was engineered by Kurt Wolf, former punk-rock guitarist for Pussy Galore. The club established a reputation as having extraordinary sound during this time. When Wolf moved on to other projects, Jon Shriver, a technician who has worked with John Legend and The Notorious B.I.G., began doing the audio engineering. The sound quality at Joe's Pub remains at the top of the "best in NYC" short list among critical reviewers.

Joe's Pub also serves as a bar and restaurant during performance hours and is known as being a top romantic spot in New York City after opening. When The Public reopened in 2012 after the renovation, the Pub's food and beverage partner Joe's Pub LLC - Kevin Abbott, Serge Becker, Josh Pickard and Paul Salmon - was joined by the Noho Hospitality Group, the restaurant group led by Andrew Carmellini and Luke Ostrom. The group also launched a full-service restaurant, The Library at The Public.

The decor of Joe's Pub is the work of interior designer and Joe's Pub LLC partner Serge Becker, the man behind many New York City hotspots, including La Esquina on Delancey Street. Patrons often note an accordion encased along the east wall of the Pub: Becker intended the design of the interior to be modeled after the accordion, from the striped, bee-pollen bar, to the strip lighting, to the exposed sound-proofing. Along the south wall, photographs of Joe Papp and famous colleagues are on display. At one point, the photos featured a young Kevin Spacey, mustachioed in fur coat. With the 2011 renovation, the photos were updated to include artists like Leonard Cohen, Adele, Allen Toussaint, Alan Cumming, Amy Winehouse and, of course, Joseph Papp. From 2006 to 2012 archival artist Michael Arthur drew the performers live and many of his drawings can be found displayed throughout the club.
