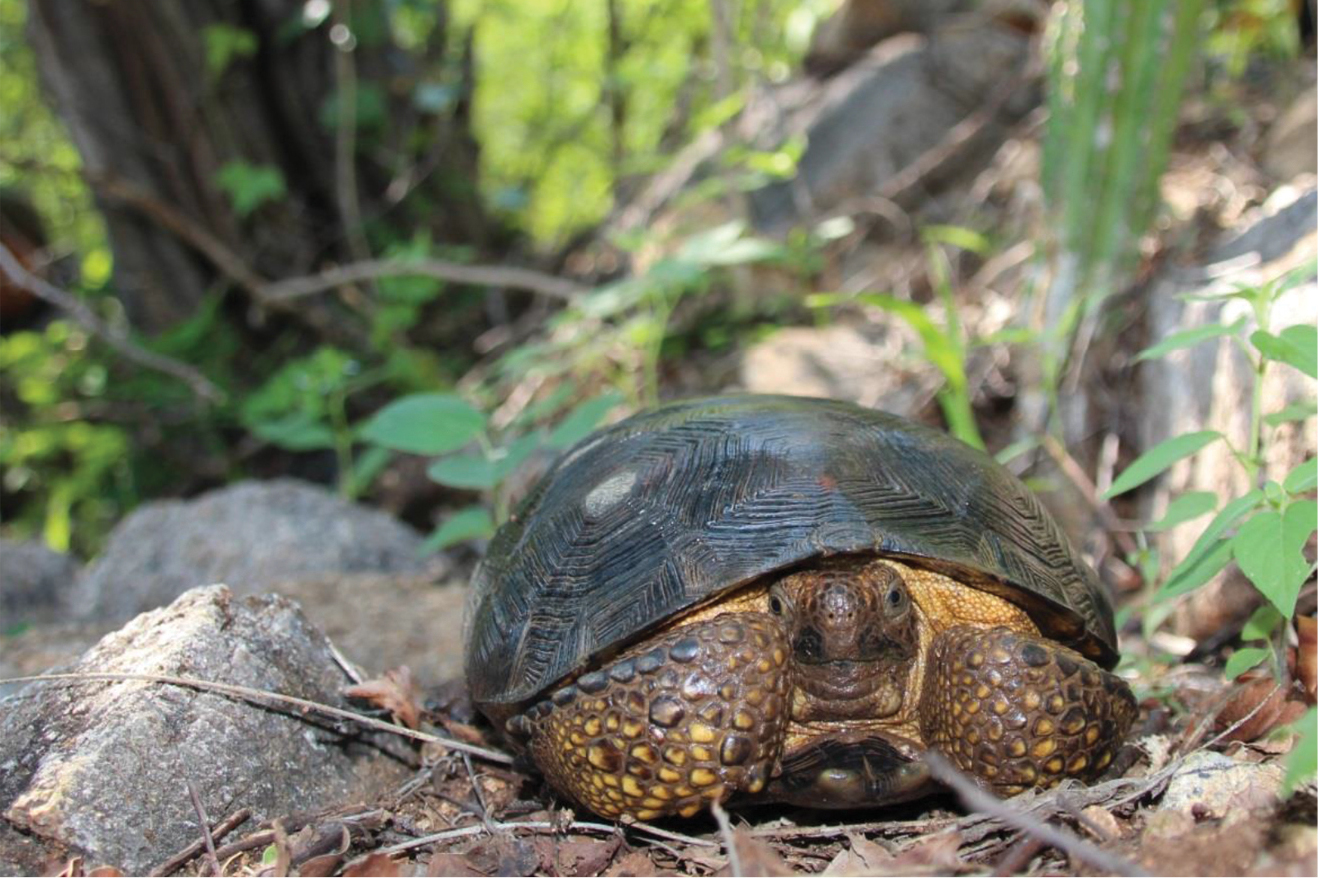

Conservation status
- Vulnerable (IUCN 3.1)
- CITES Appendix II (CITES)

Scientific classification
- Kingdom: Animalia
- Phylum: Chordata
- Class: Reptilia
- Order: Testudines
- Suborder: Cryptodira
- Family: Testudinidae
- Genus: Gopherus
- Species: G. evgoodei

Binomial name
- Gopherus evgoodei Edwards et al., 2016

= Goode's thornscrub tortoise =

Species of tortoise

The Goode's thornscrub tortoise, also known as the Sinaloan thornscrub tortoise, Sinaloan desert tortoise or Goode's desert tortoise (Gopherus evgoodei), is a species of tortoise that is native to the Sinaloan desert region. First described in 2016, G. evgoodei inhabits Tropical Deciduous Forest and Sinaloan Desertscrub biomes in Mexico. Its range may overlap in the north with G. morafkai, the Morafka's or Sonoran desert tortoise.

Goode's thornscrub tortoise is named for Eric V. Goode, a conservationist, naturalist, and founder of the Turtle Conservancy.

== Taxon history ==
Bogert and Oliver were the first researchers to notice a distinct morphology in the southern range of what was then considered G. agassizii, but could not confirm a new species due to limitations of small sample size. Edwards et al. sampled 233 tortoises that represented Sonoran and Sinaloan lineages of G. morafkai. The authors then conducted a large-scale genetic analysis that when combined with significant ecological and morphological differentiation, suggested that the southernmost Gopherus "Sinaloan" population constituted a newly described species, G. evgoodei.

Hybrid zones for G. morafkai and G. evgoodei have been found in a narrow ecotone between the Sonoran Desert scrub and the Sonoran Thorn scrub in Mexico.

== Description ==
Gopherus evgoodei differs from G. morafkai and G. agassizii in that it is flatter in its shell profile, has rounded foot pads and multiple enlarged spurs on the radial-humeral joint. It also has orange tones in the integument (skin) and shell and a distinctly shallower concavity on the plastron of males.

== Habitat ==
Gopherus evgoodei lives in hills and low mountains, and prefers slopes, boulders and rock outcrops. Like the Mojave and Sonoran desert tortoises, it digs burrows in the soil, but prefers to excavate under boulders.

=== Activity ===
Gopherus evgoodei is active from June until November and it is assumed this corresponds with monsoonal rains and corresponding plant growth.

== Conservation ==
Gopherus evgoodei resides in threatened habitat and has a smaller distribution than G. agassizii or G. morafkai. In 2018, the IUCN Tortoise and Freshwater Turtle Specialist Group recommended a re-assessment and re-classification of all six Gopherus species. This reclassification would move G. evgoodei from Near Endangered (NE) to Vulnerable (VU).
