= Urban Bush Women =

General information
- Name: Urban Bush Women
- Year founded: 1984
- Founder: Jawole Willa Jo Zollar
- Website: urbanbushwomen.org

Artistic staff
- Artistic director: Jawole Willa Jo Zollar

Urban Bush Women (UBW), founded in 1984 by Jawole Willa Jo Zollar, is a Brooklyn, New York-based non-profit dance company and professional African-American women's dance company. The ensemble performs choreography by Zollar and several other choreographers, often with a focus on the experiences of women of African descent.

== Description ==
Urban Bush Women aims to engage with artists, activists, audiences, and communities through performances, artist development, education, and community engagement.

UBW has performed throughout the United States, as well as Asia, Australia, Canada, Germany, South America, Europe and Senegal (in collaboration with Germaine Acogny and her all-male Compagnie JANT-BI).

Performances in the US include Jacob's Pillow, Spoleto USA, National Black Arts Festival, Dance Umbrella UK, and Lincoln Center. The company's repertory consists of 33 works choreographed by Zollar including ambitious collaborations with jazz artist David Murray; poets Laurie Carlos and Carl Hancock Rux; directors Steve Kent and Elizabeth Herron; and the National Song and Dance Company of Mozambique (supported by The Ford Foundation's Africa Exchange Program).

=== Programs ===
Programs run by the centre include the Summer Leadership Institute (SLI), BOLD (Builders, Organizers & Leaders through Dance) and the Choreographic Center Initiative. UBW affects the overall ecology of the arts by promoting artistic legacies; projecting the voices of the under-heard and people of color; bringing attention to and addressing issues of equity in the dance field and throughout the United States; and by providing platforms and serving as a conduit for experimental art makers.

=== Works ===
Year	Name
2016	SCAT!
2015	Walking With ‘Trane Side A & B
2014	Hep Hep Sweet Sweet; Walking With 'Trane, Chapter 2; Dark Swan; Chalabati
2010	Zollar: Uncensored; Body Talk
2009	Naked City
1995	Batty Moves

== Recognition ==
The company has been commissioned by presenters nationwide, and includes among its honors a New York Dance and Performance Award (“Bessie”); the Capezio Award for Outstanding Achievement in Dance; and two 2004 Doris Duke Awards for New Work from the American Dance Festival. In March 2010, UBW toured South America as part of DanceMotion USA, a cultural diplomacy initiative spearheaded by the U.S. Department of State's Bureau of Educational and Cultural Affairs and the Brooklyn Academy of Music.

In 2016, the company was awarded the Dance/USA Honor Award. The company received the Bessie Lifetime Achievement in Dance Award in 2017.
