= Jawole Willa Jo Zollar =

American dancer, teacher and choreographer (born 1950)

Zollar in 2017

Jawole Willa Jo Zollar (born December 21, 1950) is an American dancer, teacher and choreographer of modern dance. She is the founder of the Urban Bush Women dance company.

== Biography ==
One of six children, she was born Willa Jo Zollar in Kansas City, Missouri, to parents Alfred Zollar Jr. and Dorothy Delores Zollar. From age seven to seventeen, Zollar received her dance education from Joseph Stevenson, former student of Katherine Dunham. Zollar also had early training in Afro-Cuban and other native dance forms which later helped to shape her teaching aesthetic. She received a Bachelor of Arts in dance from the University of Missouri at Kansas City and her Master of Fine Arts from Florida State University. She has been a professor at Florida State University's School of Dance since at least 2011, when she was named the Robert O. Lawton Distinguished Professor of Dance. In 1980, Zollar moved to New York City, where she studied under Dianne McIntyre, artistic director for Sounds in Motion Dance Company. In 1984, she left the company and established her own, called the Urban Bush Women, which became the first major dance company consisting of all-female African-American dancers.

== Movement style and choreography ==
Zollar's choreographic style is influenced by the dance traditions of Black Americans—modern dance, African dance, and social dance. Her movement synthesizes influences from modern dance (a combination of Dunham, Graham, Cunningham, and Limón techniques), Afro-Cuban, Haitian, and Congolese dance. She emphasizes the use of weight and fluidity as opposed to creating clean shapes. From her Afro-Cuban dance training she employs a strong sense of dynamic timing, rhythmic patterns, and continuous flow of movement. She derives many of her movement ideas from African-American culture—allowing the "church testifying, emotional energy shap[e] the form, and the rawness of that form, like you have in jazz," she says.

In her choreography, Zollar creates avant-garde dance-theater productions that speak from the Black female perspective. Her pieces are collaborative performances between dancers, vocalists, artists, actors, composers and musicians, including vocalizations, a cappella singing, storytelling, and social commentary. Through these mediums, Zollar pushes towards social awareness and change. Zollar also explores African-American folk traditions and the reality of the Black woman's experience, tackling uncomfortable and controversial social topics such as abortion, racism, sexism, and homelessness, in a hard-edged and straightforward way. Many dance critics say that Zollar's company makes a point to show the reality of African-American culture, revealing how Black Americans express themselves when not in the presence of whites.

Zollar was director and choreographer of the Houston, Texas, world premiere Oct. 20, 2023, of "Intelligence," an opera based on the true story of a southern female spy for the Union in the American Civil War.

== Selected works ==
- 1984 River Songs; Life Dance…The Fool's Journey
- 1985 Working for Free
- 1986 Anarchy, Wild Women and Dinah; Girlfriends; Madness; LifeDance I…The Magician (The Return of She)
- 1987 Bitter Tongue
- 1988 Heat; Lipstick; Shelter; LifeDance II…The Papess
- 1989 I Don’t Know, But I Been Told, If You Keep on Dancin’ You Never Grow Old
- 1990 Praise House
- 1992 LifeDance III
- 1994 Nyabinghi Dreamtime; Vocal Attack
- 1995 Batty Moves; BONES AND ASH: A Gilda Story
- 1996 Transitions
- 1997 Self Portrait
- 1998 Hand's Singing Song
- 2000 Soul Deep
- 2001 HairStories
- 2002 Shadow's Child
- 2004 Walking with Pearl- Africa Diaries
- 2005 Walking with Pearl…Southern Diaries
- 2011 visible
- 2012 Blood Muscle Bone
- 2014 Hep Hep Sweet Sweet
- 2014 Walking with 'Trane, Chapter 2

== Awards ==
- Bessie Award for Walking With Pearl…Southern Diarie (2006)
- Guggenheim Fellowship in Choreography (2009)
- Dance Magazine Award (2015)
- Dance Teacher Award of Distinction (2021)
- MacArthur Fellowship (2021)
- Lillian and Dorothy Gish Prize (2022)
- Award of Merit for Achievement in the Performing Arts of the Association of Performing Arts Professionals (2022)
