= Eric Goode =

American businessman and film director

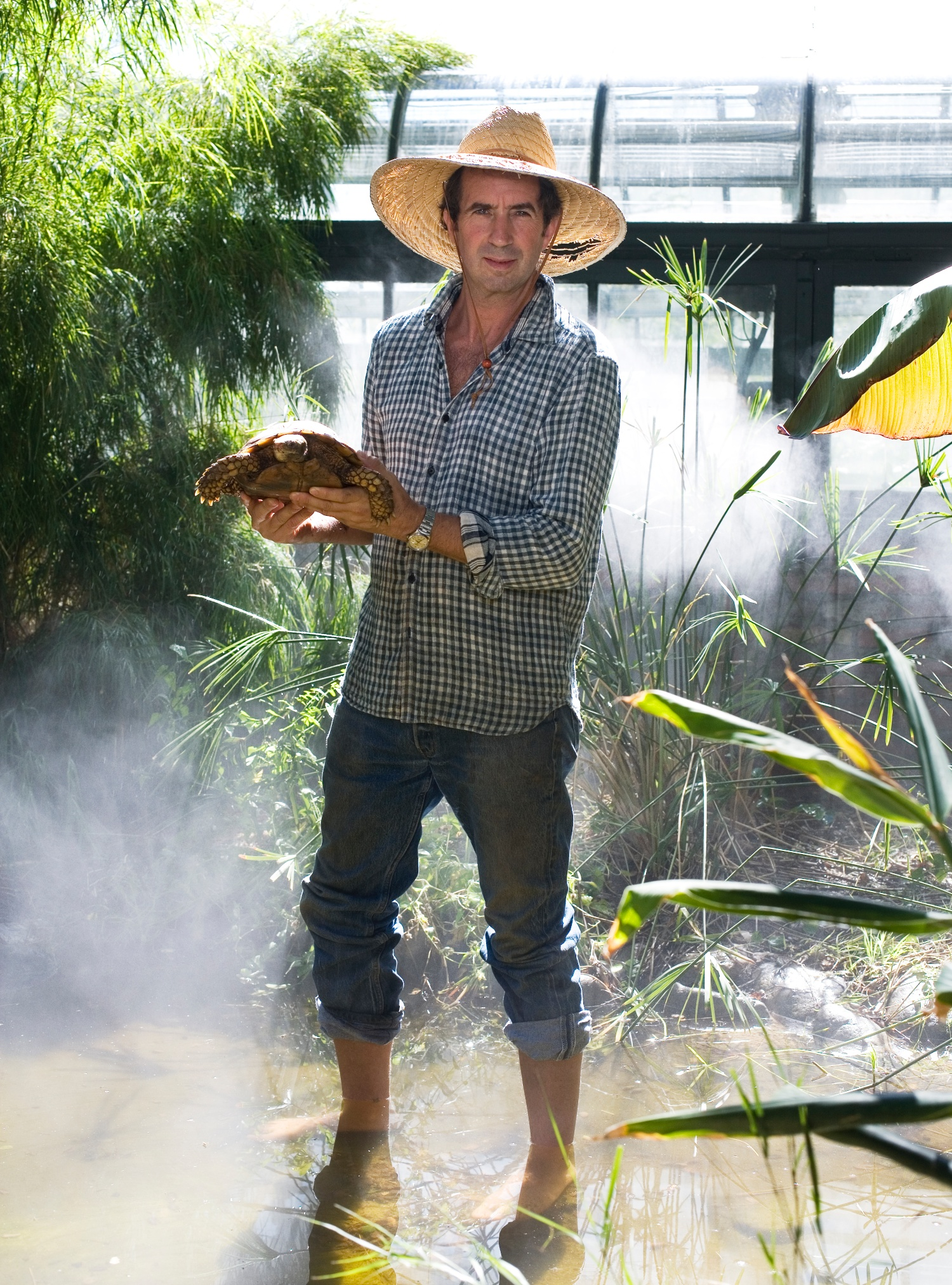
- Born: Eric V. Goode; December 19, 1957 (age 68); Rhode Island, U.S.
- Occupations: Conservationist, philanthropist, businessman, filmmaker
- Known for: Founder of the Turtle Conservancy; Directing and producing Tiger King

Eric V. Goode (born December 19, 1957) is an American entrepreneur, conservationist, and Emmy nominated filmmaker. He is known as the creator of the art nightclub Area, numerous hotels and restaurants, including the Bowery Hotel, the Waverly Inn, and the Hotel El Roblar in Ojai, CA. Goode is also known for being the founder of the Turtle Conservancy and Goode Films, which produced Tiger King (Netflix), Chimp Crazy (HBO), and Monsters of God (HBO).

== Biography ==
Born in Rhode Island in 1957 and raised in New York City until the age of 8, Goode relocated with his family to California. He is the second of five children born to Marilyn Goode, a naturalist and conservationist, and Fredrick Goode, a painter and teacher. He has lived in New York City since 1977.

Goode began his career as an artist, educated at the Academy of Art University in San Francisco, and Parsons School of Design. Much of his early work was displayed in group shows with other upcoming artists of the day, the earliest in 1981, which was curated by Keith Haring. Goode continued to make and show his art throughout the 1980s and into the early 1990s.

In 1983, Goode formed the nightclub Area. Area was known for its constantly changing themes and collaboration with artists of the time (Andy Warhol, Jean-Michel Basquiat, David Hockney, Keith Haring, Kenny Scharf, and others). Area was Goode's first business venture in which he brought art into the context of a nightclub.

In the early to mid-1990s, Goode directed music videos for bands such as Nine Inch Nails and Robbie Robertson. He and Serge Becker earned a music video production award for their work on "Pinion," by Nine Inch Nails.

Over the next two decades Goode transitioned into restaurants and hotels, including many in collaboration with his partners Serge Becker and Sean MacPherson.

In the 2010s, Goode became focused on filming the various characters that led to the creation of the documentaries Tiger King, and Tiger King 2. The success of these docuseries led to the creation of Eric's film studio, Goode Films.

Goode currently lives in New York City and California.

== Nightclubs, restaurants and hotels ==
- 1981 – The Club with no Name
- 1983 – Area
- 1988 – MK
- 1989 – BC (LA)
- 1990 – Time Cafe and Fez
- 1994 – B Bar & Grill
- 2000 – The Park
- 2001 – The Maritime Hotel
- 2003 – Matsuri (closed)
- 2003 – La Bottega (closed)
- 2003 – Hiro Ballroom (closed)
- 2006 – Waverly Inn
- 2006 – Lafayette House
- 2007 – Bowery Hotel
- 2007 – Gemma
- 2008 – The Jane Hotel
- 2014 – Ludlow Hotel
- 2024 – Hotel El Roblar

== Philanthropy and land preservation ==
After a career in the hospitality business, Goode shifted his focus to wildlife philanthropy after being approached by John Behler of the Wildlife Conservation Society in 2003. Goode first created a rescue and breeding center for endangered turtles and tortoises under Behler's guidance. In 2005, Goode formed his own public charity the Turtle Conservancy. The mission of the Turtle Conservancy is to protect threatened turtles and tortoises and their habitats worldwide. Goode's conservation philosophy centers around turtles as umbrella species, whereby thousands of species are saved by protecting land for turtles and tortoises.

Since its inception, Turtle Conservancy has helped to protect over 60,000 acres of wild land around the world. The organization works to protect turtles, tortoises and other animals on five continents. Guerilla documentaries and public service announcements directed by Goode and the Turtle Conservancy have amassed millions of views across various social media platforms. These documentaries raise awareness of wildlife trafficking, habitat destruction, and the pet trade. Goode has personally donated over 30 million dollars towards wildlife conservation and land protection. His conservation work has been featured on 60 Minutes, Charlie Rose, Racing Extinction, The New Yorker, NPR and CNN.

Goode was recognized by the wildlife community for his efforts, with a tortoise named after him in 2016. The Goode's thornscrub tortoise (Gopherus evgoodei) is a desert species from Northern Mexico described by a team of American and Mexican biologists.

Goode has also been a founding advisory board member of vildwerk., a nonprofit organization inspiring conservation awareness through dance, since 2022.

=== South Africa ===
In South Africa, the Turtle Conservancy, along with its partner organizations, has purchased over 1,000 acres of the last remaining habitat for the critically endangered geometric tortoise (Psammobates geometricus).

=== Sonora, Mexico ===
The Turtle Conservancy secured approximately 1,000 acres of tropical deciduous forest in southern Sonora, Mexico, for the protection of the Goode's thornscrub tortoise (Gopherus evgoodei).

=== Durango, Mexico ===
The Turtle Conservancy has purchased a significant portion (over 60,000 acres) of the last remaining habitat of the Bolson tortoise (Gopherus flavomarginatus). The largest of the North American terrestrial reptiles, this tortoise has been known to science only since 1959.

=== Palawan, Philippines ===
1,890 acres was secured for the protection of the critically endangered Palawan forest turtle (Siebenrockiella leytensis) in the Philippines.

=== Other conservation projects ===
Other conservation projects that Eric Goode has spearheaded include:

- Goode leads conservation for the ploughshare tortoise, the world's rarest tortoise through a partnership with Durrell Wildlife Conservation Trust. Goode has supported conservation both in Madagascar and sits on the Angonoka Working Group Committee.
- Goode supports emerging research for turtles and tortoises by funding the Turtle Conservation Fund, Chelonian Conservation & Biology Journal, and the Turtle Survival Alliance every year since 2005.
- Goode has created a conservation center in Ojai, CA to support local education and wildlife protection.

== Boards and councils ==
- Board member Turtle Conservancy
- Board member Global Wildlife Conservation
- Board member Rainforest Trust
- Board member Chelonian Research Institute
- Board member Turtle Conservation Fund
- Board member International Iguana Foundation

== Publications ==
=== The Tortoise ===
The Tortoise is an annual magazine publication of the Turtle Conservancy dedicated to the conservation of turtles and tortoises. The wide scope of the magazine reaches readers from all over the world. Its audience includes everyone from world-renowned scientists and biologists, to travelers, naturalists, ecologists and conservationists, as well as a general audience interested in wildlife preservation and environmental protection. It is not a scientific journal. It is a publication about the wonder of turtles and tortoises and about the conservation challenges they face, and it is about the people who are devoted to saving these creatures from extinction.

=== Area: 1983–1987 ===
In 2013, Abrams published a 360-page coffee table book on the seminal nightclub AREA, authored by Eric and Jennifer Goode. Drawing from a rich archive of material, Eric and Jennifer tell the behind-the-scenes story of the club and its people, creating an illustrated memoir of an exciting time and place in the history of New York nightlife. To accompany the launch of the book Eric collaborated with Jeffrey Deitch to curate an exhibition at The Hole gallery. The show consisted of original installations as well as pieces from many of the artists that participated or were influenced by the club.

== Film and videos ==
=== Docuseries ===
In 2020, Netflix premiered Tiger King, a seven-episode docuseries directed and produced by Eric Goode about people who own and breed lions, tigers, and other big cats. The show quickly became one of the most watched shows on the Netflix platform.

In 2024, Goode directed and produced Chimp Crazy for HBO, revolving around animal broker Tonia Haddix, caught up with authorities and animal rights groups over her chimpanzee Tonka.

In 2026, Goode directed and executive produced Monsters of God for HBO, produced by A24, with Josh Safdie among the executive producers. It had its world premiere at the 2026 South by Southwest Film & TV Festival in March 2026, where it won the Audience Award in the TV Premiere section.

=== Natural history films ===
Year	Documentary
2005	John L. Behler Chelonian Center
2006	Galapagos Islands
2007	Madagascar
2008	The Argentine Tortoise
2009	In Search of the Okinawa Leaf Turtle
2010	The Great Tortoise Transect
2011	In Search of the Impressed Tortoise

=== Music videos ===
Year	Artist	Music video
1992	Nine Inch Nails	"Help Me I Am in Hell"
1992	Nine Inch Nails	"Pinion"
1993	Digital Orgasm	"Time to Believe"
1994	CeCe Peniston	"Hit by Love"
1994	Terrorvision	"Oblivion"
1998	Robbie Robertson	"Unbound"

== Art ==
Most of Goode's art is created as a vitrine, or display case, with three-dimensional artwork inside. Similar to Joseph Cornell, his work incorporates many aspects of assemblage. Goode's work also has notable similarities to Damien Hirst and Jeff Vaughan, especially his tendency to represent elements of the natural world in his mixed-media installations.

=== Exhibitions ===
- 1981 – Group Show curated by Keith Haring, Mudd Club
- 1987 – "Subject Object", Group Show, 56 Bleecker Gallery
- 1988 – Group Show, Bess Butler Gallery
- 1989 – One Man Show, Bess Cutler Gallery
- 1989 – "American Pie", Group Show, Bess Cutler Gallery
- 1989 – "Don't Bungle the Jungle", Group Show, Tony Shafrazi Gallery
- 1989 – "New Work, New York", Group Show, Helander Gallery
- 1990 – "Amnesty International", Group Show, Tony Shafrazi Gallery
- 2013 – "AREA: The Exhibition", Group Show, The Hole Gallery, curated by Jeffrey Deitch and Glenn O'Brien

== Awards ==
- 2022 – Turtle Conservancy Legacy Award, United Nations Hospitality Committee for UN Delegations (HCUND)
- 2016 – Behler Turtle Conservation Award
