= Sphaerodactylus townsendi =

Conservation status
- Least Concern (IUCN 3.1)

Scientific classification
- Kingdom: Animalia
- Phylum: Chordata
- Class: Reptilia
- Order: Squamata
- Suborder: Gekkota
- Family: Sphaerodactylidae
- Genus: Sphaerodactylus
- Species: S. townsendi

Binomial name
- Sphaerodactylus townsendi Grant, 1931

Synonyms
- Sphaerodactylus townsendi Grant, 1931; Sphaerodactylus nicholsi townsendi — Thomas & Schwartz, 1966; Sphaerodactylus townsendi — Schwartz & Henderson, 1991

Species of reptile

Sphaerodactylus townsendi, known commonly as the Townsend's dwarf sphaero or Townsend's least gecko, is a small species of lizard in the family Sphaerodactylidae. The species is endemic to Puerto Rico.

== Etymology ==
The specific name, townsendi, is in honor of American zoologist Charles Haskins Townsend.

== Habitat ==
The preferred habitats of S. townsendi are forest and shrubland at altitudes of 0–200 m (0–656 ft), but it may also be found in introduced vegetation.

== Reproduction ==
S. townsendi is oviparous.
