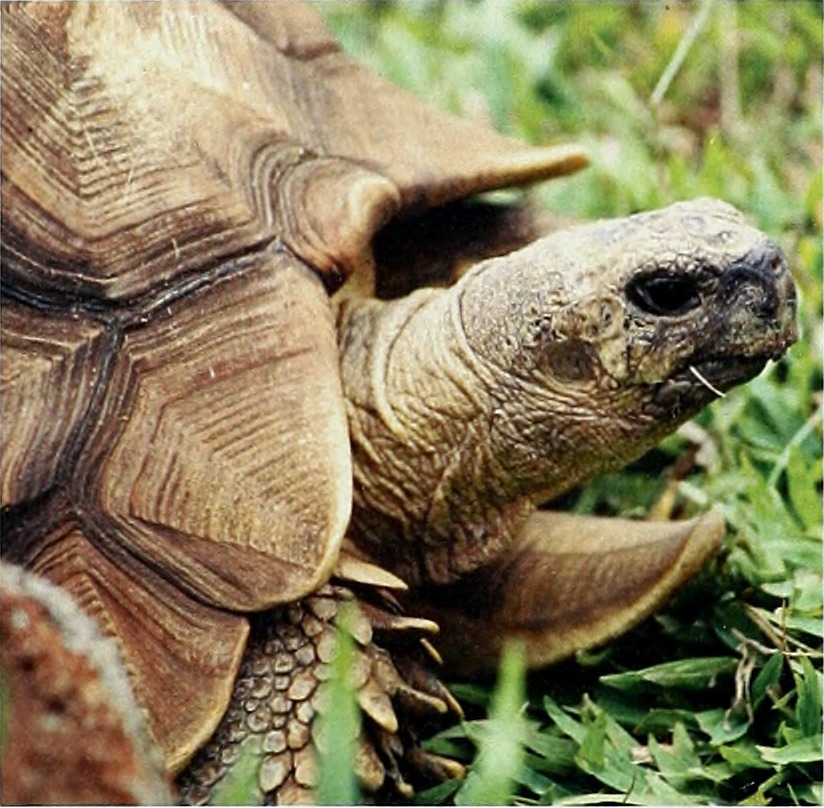

Conservation status
- Critically Endangered (IUCN 3.1)
- CITES Appendix I

Scientific classification
- Kingdom: Animalia
- Phylum: Chordata
- Class: Reptilia
- Order: Testudines
- Suborder: Cryptodira
- Family: Testudinidae
- Genus: Astrochelys
- Species: A. yniphora

Binomial name
- Astrochelys yniphora Vaillant, 1885

Synonyms
- List: Testudo yniphora Vaillant, 1885; Testudo radiata yniphora Siebenrock, 1909; Testudo hyniphora Vaillant & Grandidier, 1910 (ex errore); Asterochelys yniphora Loveridge & Williams, 1957; Geochelone yniphora Loveridge & Williams, 1957; Geochelone ynophora Arnold, 1979 (ex errore); Astrochelys yniphora Bour, 1985; Testudo (Geochelone) yinphora Paull, 1999 (ex errore); Angonoka yniphora Le, Raxworthy, McCord & Mertz, 2006

= Angonoka tortoise =

Species of tortoise

The angonoka tortoise (Astrochelys yniphora) is a critically endangered species of tortoise severely threatened by poaching for the illegal pet trade. It is endemic to Madagascar. It is also known as the angonoka, ploughshare tortoise, Madagascar tortoise, or Madagascar angulated tortoise. There may be fewer than 400 of these tortoises left in the wild. It is found only in the dry forests of the Baly Bay area of northwestern Madagascar, near the town of Soalala (including Baie de Baly National Park). A captive-breeding facility was established in 1986 by the Jersey Wildlife Preservation Trust (now the Durrell Trust) in collaboration with the Water and Forests Department. In 1996, 75 tortoises were stolen, which later appeared for sale in the Netherlands. The project was ultimately successful, achieving 224 captive-bred juveniles out of 17 adults in 2004. Project Angonoka developed conservation plans that involved local communities making firebreaks, along with the creation of a park to protect the tortoise and the forests. Monitoring of the angonoka tortoise in the global pet trade has also continued to be advocated.

== Taxonomy ==
This species was originally described in 1885 by French zoologist Léon Vaillant, who named it Testudo yniphora (from Ancient Greek ὕνις (húnis) 'ploughshare' and -φόρος (-phóros) 'bearer') based on the distinguished shape of the gular scute in the front of the plastron.

The angonoka tortoise (A. yniphora) and the radiated tortoise (A. radiata) are the only species in the genus Astrochelys. Astrochelys is attributed to John Edward Gray, who used the name in his 1873 book Hand-list of the specimens of shield reptiles in the British Museum. The parent family for Astrochelys is Testudinidae, the tortoise family.

The name angonoka comes from the Malagasy word used as the local name of the species. The alternative common name, ploughshare tortoise, refers to the appearance of the gular scute of the plastron.

== Description ==
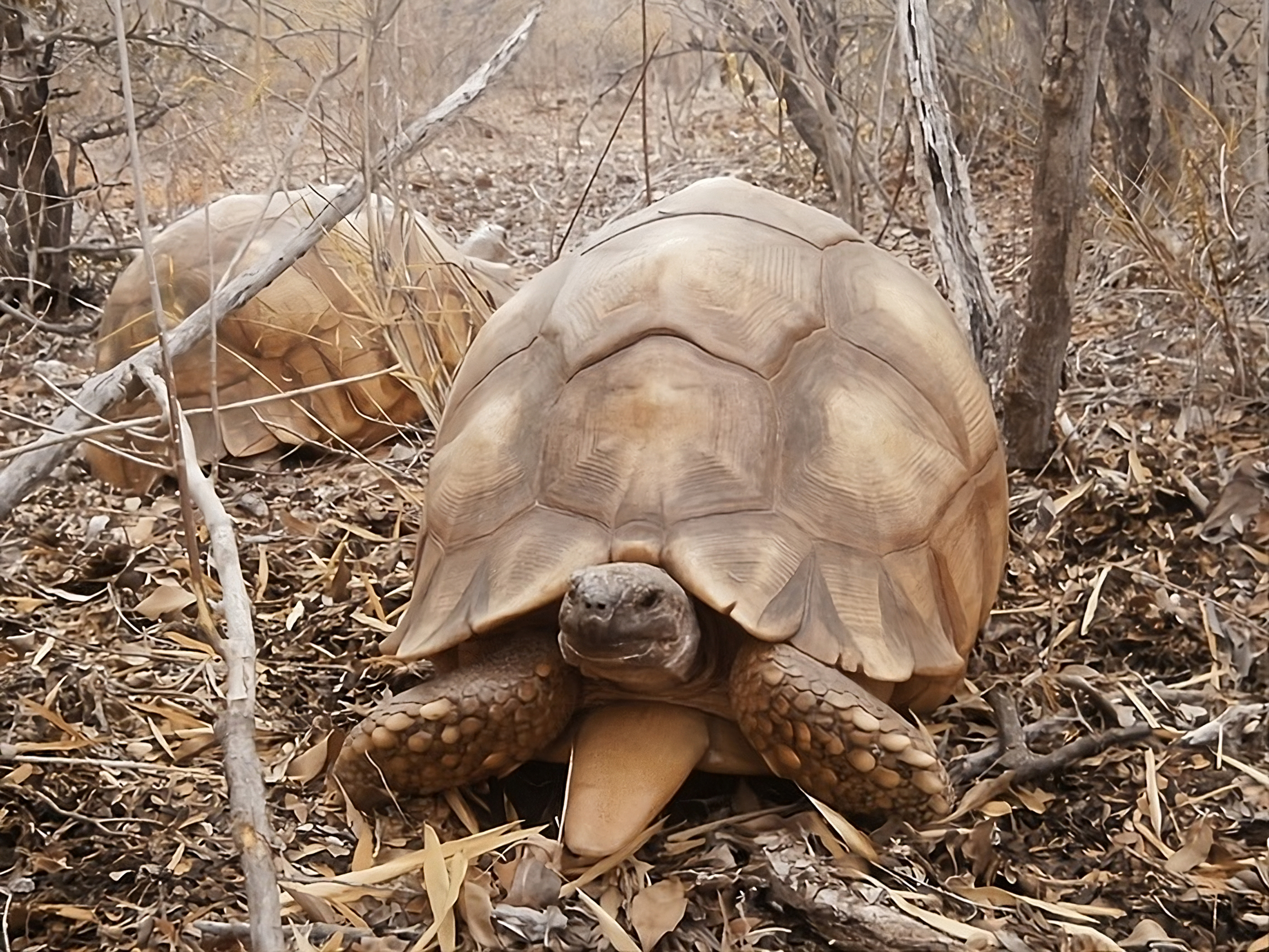
Wild Angonoka tortoises

The carapace is highly domed and light brown in colour with prominent growth rings on each scute. The outer parts of the vertebral are a darker brown. The gular scute of the plastron projects forward between the front legs and curves upward toward the neck.

Males are larger than females, reaching a carapace length up to 17 in (43 cm). The average length of an adult male angonoka tortoise is 414.8 mm (16.33 in) and the average weight is 10.3 kg (23 lb). Females measure at a 370.1 mm (14.57 in) average and weigh 8.8 kg (19 lb) on average.

== Distribution and habitat ==
In the wild, this species is only found in Madagascar, where it is endemic to the dry forests in the Baly Bay area of northwestern Madagascar, near the town of Soalala (including Baie de Baly National Park). The distribution is 25 to 60 km^{2} (9.7 to 23.2 sq mi) in range around Baly Bay.

The Baly Bay region is made up of savanna, mangrove swamps, and dry deciduous forest. They make use of bamboo-scrub habitat which is made up of different types of shrubs, savanna grasses, bamboo, and open areas with no vegetation. The flora includes shrubbery usually under 2 m (6 ft 7 in) in height, such as Bauhinia and Terminalia species, and Perrierbambus madagascariensis bamboo, which forms dense thickets. The elevation of this area is under 50 m (160 ft) above sea level.

=== Population ===
The first population surveys of this species were performed by Juvik & Blanc in 1974 and Juvik et al. in 1981, in which they estimated the total wild population to be a few hundred, based on a population density of around five tortoises per km^{2} and a potential range of approximately 100 km^{2} (39 sq mi) in suitable habitat. In 1983 (published 1985) Curl et al. estimated a total population of 100–400 individuals in a range of 40–80 km^{2} (15–31 sq mi), found in five subpopulations, two east and three west of the Andranomavo River. The two to the east were Beheta and Cape Sada; the three to the west were Ambatomainty, Andrafiafaly, and Betainalika. The most accessible and most studied area was on Cape Sada, and numerous surveys in the 1990s estimated a population there of around 30 individuals.

In 1999 Smith et al. performed an exhaustive survey of the population on Cape Sada, counting 96 individuals, of which approximately half were adults. They concluded that the Cape Sada population, which was split into 3 subpopulations by Juvik et al. in 1997 on the basis of what they considered suitable habitat, was a single group because the animals utilized the more open habitat in the centre of the Cape and moved from between the three more forested areas. They also concluded the remote Ambatomainty and Andrafiafaly sites were in fact were two ends of an extensive tract of contiguous habitat. Smith et al. did not provide a total population estimate, but based on their research a population of 400–1500 tortoises could be extrapolated.

According to Leuteritz & Pedroso, writing for the IUCN in 2008, estimates of the wild population by Smith et al. in 1999 and Pedroso in 2000 ranged from 440 to 770 (giving an average of around 600). In 2005 the Durrell Wildlife Conservation Trust (DWCT), which helps run the main captive breeding program, estimated a wild population of 800 individuals. In 2004 Pedroso used a Population Viability Analysis to predict it would be extinct (in the wild, presumably) by 2014 to 2019. In 2008 Pedroso estimated that his estimate of 440 in 2000 had decreased to 400 (half being adults), and using this estimated decrease, among other factors (such using a population model split into more subpopulations), Leuteritz & Pedroso in 2008 considered it to be critically endangered.

In 1986 the DWCT (then known as the Jersey Wildlife Preservation Trust) established a captive breeding centre at the Ampijoroa in Madagascar, which was able to breed the first captive ploughshare tortoises the following year. In 1997 the Madagascar government created Baie de Baly National Park to conserve to tortoise, and the first five captive-bred tortoises were released back into the wild in the park in 1998 by the DWCT. By 2005 the DWCT release programme had been significantly expanded and by 2011 the first baby tortoises had been born in the wild from captive-bred and released animals. In 2015 20 more animals were released, bringing the total number of released tortoises to 100 at the time.

In 2016 poaching intensified, including a foiled attempt to raid the captive breeding centre (a raid in 1996 had 75 tortoises looted). It was estimated in 2016 at a CITES conference that the wild population had dropped to 100 adults and the species would be extinct in the wild by 2018.

== Ecology and behaviour ==
The angonoka tortoise has been observed feeding on grasses found in open rocky areas of bamboo scrub. It is also known to eat shrubs, forbs, and herbs. While it has been seen eating dead bamboo leaves, it has never been observed eating living bamboo. As well as these plants, the tortoise has also been seen eating the dried feces of bushpigs and carnivores.

The introduced bush pig is the main predator of the angonoka tortoise; it eats the tortoises' eggs and young.

In captivity, males must be separated due to aggression towards each other, including ramming, pushing, and overturning with the enlarged gular scute. The aggression is used to establish dominance.

=== Reproduction ===
It is expected to become sexually mature once reaching 15 years old. The tortoise can produce one to six eggs per clutch and up to four clutches every season. The reproductive season is from 15 January to 30 May. The angonoka tortoise's reproductive patterns coincide with the seasonal rainfall patterns of the region, with both mating and hatching occurring at the onset of the rainy seasons. With a 71.9% fertility rate and a 54.6% hatching success rate, about 4.3 hatchlings are produced per female tortoise.

== Conservation ==
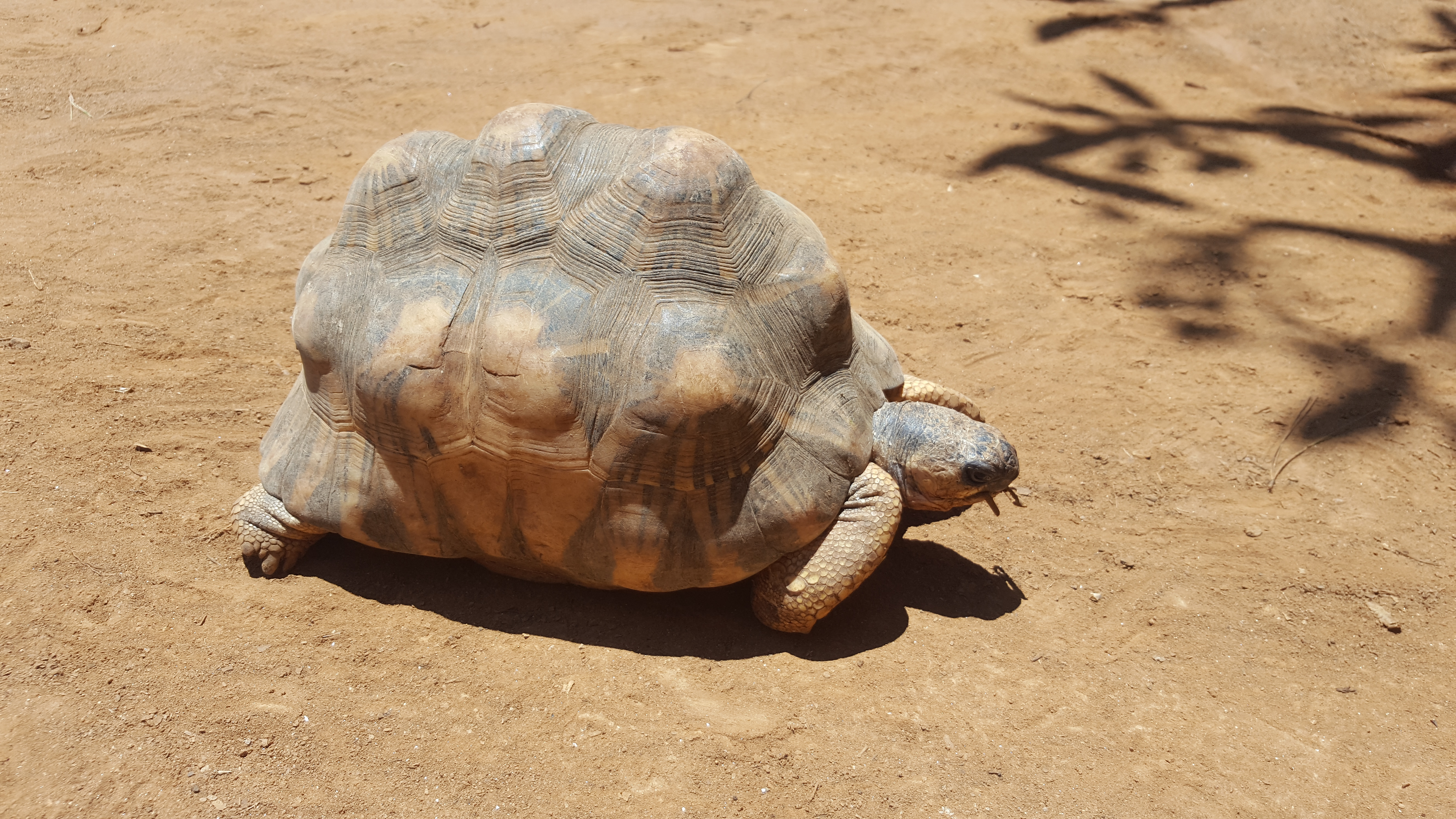
Angonoka tortoise bred in captivity in the Ivato Croc Farm, Antananarivo

This species is one of the rarest land tortoises in the world, classified as Critically Endangered on the IUCN Red List. The principal threats to the species are believed to be fires started to clear land for cattle grazing, and collection for the pet trade. The tortoise has a restricted distribution, likely a result of past collection for food, the expansion of agriculture, and accompanying fires. An additional threat is predation by the bushpig. Fires made to clear land can get out of control, turning into wildfires, which cut back more of the angonoka tortoise's habitat. Following efforts to create firebreaks through controlled fires in savanna fringes by conservation groups, out-of-control fires have decreased, until less than 50 ha (120 acres) of its habitat were burnt in 2004. Another reason why the Angonoka might go extinct is that the species is concentrated only in one area. They are not dispersed, which means anything such as severe weather and disease could wipe the species out.

The angonoka tortoise is often captured to be sold in the international pet trade. Though some enforcement of restrictions on illegal trade is successful, including the confiscation of the illegally obtained tortoises, they remain in incredibly high demand for the global pet trade. This is a major threat to the tortoises remaining in the wild. Conservationists mark the shells with identifying marks which mars the most attractive feature and make them less desirable to poachers and wealthy collectors. The engraving is a last-ditch effort to protect the animals.

In addition to its Red List listing, the angonoka tortoise is now protected under the national law of Madagascar and listed on CITES Appendix I, commercial trade in wild-caught specimens is illegal (permitted only in exceptional licensed circumstances). For the conservation of the angonoka tortoise, the Durrell Wildlife Conservation Trust created Project Angonoka in 1986. The Water and Forests Department, the Durrell Trust, and the World Wide Fund for Nature work together on this project. A captive-breeding facility was established for this species in Madagascar in 1986 by the Jersey Wildlife Preservation Trust (now the Durrell Trust) in collaboration with the Water and Forests Department. In May 1996, 75 tortoises were stolen from the facility. The thieves were never found, but 33 tortoises later appeared for sale in the Netherlands. The project ultimately was a success, achieving 224 captive-bred juveniles out of 17 adults in December 2004. After the 1990s, Project Angonoka started ecological research on the tortoise and the development of conservation plans that involved the communities surrounding the habitat. The work with the community involved local people in making firebreaks, along with the creation of a park proposed by the community to protect the tortoise and the forests. Monitoring of the angonoka tortoise in the global pet trade has continued to be advocated.

In March 2013, smugglers were arrested after carrying a single bag containing 54 angonoka tortoises and 21 radiated tortoises (Astrochelys radiata) through Suvarnabhumi International Airport in Thailand. The 54 angonoka tortoises might be as much as a tenth of the world's population of the species.

On 20 March 2016, the custom officials at Mumbai airport seized 146 tortoises from a mishandled baggage of a Nepal citizen. This bag was said to belong to a transit passenger, who arrived from Madagascar and flew to Kathmandu leaving this bag behind. Out of the 146 tortoises, 139 were radiated tortoises (Astrochelys radiata) and seven were angonoka tortoises (Astrochelys yniphora), both critically endangered tortoise species of Madagascar. Two radiated tortoises were found dead with broken shell.

On 12 June 2016, it was reported that six angonoka tortoises and 72 radiated tortoises had gone missing from a breeding facility in Thailand.

== Bibliography ==
- Nilsson, G. (1983). Endangered Species Handbook. Animal Welfare Institute.
- Rhodin, Anders G. J.; van Dijk, Peter Paul; Inverson, John B.; Shaffer, H. Bradley (14 December 2010). "Turtles of the world, 2010 update: Annotated checklist of taxonomy, synonymy, distribution and conservation status" (PDF). Chelonian Research Monographs. 5: 000.89 – 000.138. Archived (PDF) from the original on 17 July 2011.
- Fritz, Uwe; Havaš, Peter (2007). "Checklist of Chelonians of the World" (PDF). Vertebrate Zoology. 57 (2): 149–368. doi:10.3897/vz.57.e30895.
