= Turtle Conservancy =

US-based nonprofit organization

- Abbreviation: TC
- Founder: Eric Goode, Maurice Rodrigues
- Type: Nonprofit
- Tax ID no.: 20-2899240
- Legal status: 501(c)(3)
- Purpose: Conservation and habitat preservation
- Headquarters: Ojai, California
- Board Chair: Anders Rhodin, M.D.
- President & CEO: Eric Goode
- Website: www.turtleconservancy.org

The Turtle Conservancy (TC) is a conservation organization that aims to protect endangered turtles, tortoises, and their habitats worldwide.

TC has supported projects in China, Guyana, India, Mexico, Madagascar, Nicaragua, Pakistan, South Africa, the Philippines, and the United States. It has also been involved in projects in Southeast Asia, where they investigated the illegal animal trade.

== Programs ==
TC's conservation strategies include habitat protection, restoration, and stewardship, animal reintroduction, and a fieldwork grant program. It works within five main domains: species conservation, protection of wild lands, research science, global awareness and education, and illegal trade prevention.
