= Jeff A. Weiss =

American businessman and academic

- Born: December 24, 1964 (age 61); Boston, Massachusetts, US
- Education: Phillips Academy Andover, Dartmouth College, Harvard Law School
- Occupations: Businessperson, former college administrator
- Predecessor: Joseph B. Moore, Margaret McKenna

Jeff A. Weiss (born December 24, 1964) is an American businessperson and academic known for his work in negotiation. He was president of Lesley University in Cambridge, Massachusetts from 2016 to 2018.

== Early life and career ==
Jeff A. Weiss is a native of Massachusetts. He earned his A.B. (magna cum laude) in government from Dartmouth College, and a J.D. (cum laude) from Harvard Law School. He is an international expert in negotiation and partnerships, and served for many years on both the faculties of the Tuck School of Business at Dartmouth College and the United States Military Academy at West Point. He is co-founder of the West Point Negotiation Project, where he also served as co-director.

He was awarded West Point's 2010 Apgar Award for Excellence in Teaching, the Department of the Army's Commander's Award for Civilian Service, and the Department of the Army's Outstanding Civilian Service Medal.

Prior to becoming president of Lesley University, Weiss led the Boston-based consulting firm Vantage Partners for nearly 20 years. Prior to that he was a partner at Conflict Management, Inc. and helped to found Conflict Management Group, a not-for-profit (now part of Mercy Corps) that works with government leaders throughout the world on peace building, from post-apartheid South Africa to the Middle East.

He is widely published and a regular contributor to the Harvard Business Review. He most recently authored the "HBR Guide to Negotiating" (2016).

On February 24, 2016, the trustees of Lesley University announced Weiss as the university's sixth president, succeeding Joseph B. Moore. Weiss began his term on July 1, 2016. On June 19, 2018, he announced he would step down as president of Lesley University on August 31, 2018, due to personal health reasons. Subsequently, Weiss joined the executive team at Partners HealthCare, as the Chief Strategy & Transformation Officer for the health system, a role in which he currently serves.
