= Andrew Mroczek =

American artist and curator (born 1977)

- Born: 1977 (age 48–49)
- Education: The Art Institute of Boston (BFA); Lesley University (MFA)
- Occupations: Artist; curator
- Website: andrewmroczek.com

Andrew Mroczek (born 1977) is an American artist and curator known for his collaborative work addressing LGBTQ rights in Peru. He is the director of exhibitions at Lesley University College of Art and Design, where he has curated exhibitions of Latin American and contemporary art.

His partnership with Peruvian artist Juan José Barboza-Gubo and LGBTQ activists in Peru produced a body of work titled Canon. When exhibited in Lima in 2018, the work drew condemnation from conservative Catholic groups, and the controversy prompted a congressional bill seeking to criminalize offenses against religious symbols.

== Education ==
Mroczek earned his BFA in photography from The Art Institute of Boston, and a Master of Fine Arts in visual arts from Lesley University.

== Career ==
=== Curation ===
Mroczek has curated exhibitions at Lesley University since the 2000s. Several of his exhibitions have focused on Latin American art, including "Of Cuban Invention" (2012), with Carlos Estévez, Carlos Cárdenas, and others; "Revolución Chicha" (2019), with Monky, Elliot Túpac, and others; and "Las Calles de Oaxaca" (transl. "The Streets of Oaxaca"), featuring Subterráneos, shown at Lesley University (2022) and the Erie Art Museum (2023–2024).

Mroczek's other group exhibitions include "Beyond the Fluff & Fold" (2009), which treated T-shirts by Aaron Krach, Dave Ortega, and others as fine art objects, and "Visible Soul" (2014), an exhibition of works by Louise Bourgeois, Kiki Smith, Louis Wain, Andy Warhol, Edward Weston, and others exploring the cat as artistic subject. Artscope wrote that the show "successfully brings together the playful, the peaceful, and the chaotic."

Mroczek has also curated solo exhibitions for artists including Dan Estabrook, Luba Lukova, Maud Morgan, Marilène Phipps, Robert Stivers, and Shen Wei.

=== Visual art ===
In 2013, Mroczek began collaborating with Peruvian artist Juan José Barboza-Gubo after curating an exhibit of his work in Lima. Together they created Canon, a project addressing LGBTQ rights in Peru consisting of three photographic series and a film. Canon includes portraits of transgender women and gay men wearing crowns, haloes, veils, and capes from artisans who traditionally make them for the statues in Catholic churches.

Canon has been exhibited at institutions including the Museum of Contemporary Art of Lima, the Museum of Sex, and the RISD Museum, which holds work from the series in its permanent collection. Its 2018 presentation across three venues in Lima drew condemnation from conservative Catholic groups, with a petition garnering tens of thousands of signatures. In response, Peruvian congressman Carlos Tubino introduced a bill that would criminalize religious defamation with prison sentences.

An essay in the academic journal Public argued that Canon's portraits assert the full subjectivity of their transgender subjects as "gender others" and respect both their right to be photographed and their "right to opacity." In the academic journal Postmedieval, the portraits were described as a "reversal of the savior-saved dialectic," with the women said to "not need saving" but instead to "rewrite a salvific history with transgender women at its center." Theologian Martina Bär used the series as a case study for the iconic turn in Catholic theology, arguing that such images make possible a gender-inclusive reading of Christ representation.

Following this collaboration with Barboza-Gubo, Mroczek began working independently and turned to sculpture, reimagining tools of animal control as objects exploring human desire. He has cited power dynamics as a unifying thread in this work, from the control of domesticated animals to the sexual dynamics of BDSM.

=== Teaching ===
Mroczek has taught at Northeastern University and MassArt.

== Awards ==
- 2016: FotoFest Biennial in Houston
- 2018: Photolucida Critical Mass finalist
- 2018: Premios Luces nominee for Best Photography Exhibition, El Comercio
- 2018: Residency at the Studios at MASS MoCA
- 2018: Maricielo I named one of "The 20 Best Photos of 2018" by Dazed
- 2019: Bienal Internacional de Fotografía in Bogotá, Colombia
- 2019: Fellowship from the Massachusetts Cultural Council

== Personal life ==
Mroczek is a first-generation American and was raised Catholic. He is openly gay.

== Publications ==
- Padre-patria [Fatherland]. Essays by Fabrice Houdart, Leyla Huerta, and Juan Peralta. Daylight, 2019. ISBN 978-1-942084-69-3.
