= Foley Gallery =

Art gallery in Manhattan, New York

Coordinates: 40°43′0.55″N 73°59′27.64″W

Foley Gallery is a contemporary art gallery in Manhattan, New York City, owned by Michael Foley. It moved from the Chelsea neighborhood to the Lower East Side in 2014. Among the artists it represents are Joseph Desler Costa, Wyatt Gallery, Sage Sohier, Martin Klimas, Simon Schubert, Henry Leutwyler and Ina Jang. It previously showed work by Rosalind Solomon, Polixeni Papapetrou, Rachell Sumpter and Hank Willis Thomas.

== Background ==
Michael Foley opened Foley Gallery in 2004. Years prior, he began art dealing by invitation of Frish Brandt, the former director, (now president) of Fraenkel Gallery. While under Brandt's direction, he became friendly with photographers Richard Misrach, Adam Fuss, and Hiroshi Sugimoto. The gallery exhibited art from represented artist Simon Schubert during Volta Art Fair in 2015 and 2018. Sherri Littlefield joined it as director in 2016.

== Book launches ==
In November 2016, Document, by Henry Leutwyler published by Steidl was released at Foley Gallery. Other book launches have included Jewish Treasures of the Caribbean, by Wyatt Gallery and Circadian Landscape by Jessica Antola.
