= Lissa Rivera =

American artist and curator (born 1984)

- Born: 1984 (age 41–42)
- Education: The Art Institute of Boston (BFA); School of Visual Arts (MFA)
- Known for: Photography; curation; filmmaking
- Notable work: Beautiful Boy series
- Partner: BJ Lillis
- Website: lissarivera.com

Lissa Rivera (born 1984) is an American artist and curator whose work examines gender identity, sexuality, and the construction of femininity through staged portraiture. Her series Beautiful Boy, portraits of her genderqueer partner in period dress and interiors, has been widely exhibited and won the Magnum Photography Award for Portraiture.

As Associate Curator at the Museum of Sex, Rivera organized the first U.S. museum survey of Surrealist Leonor Fini and the museum's first bilingual exhibition.

== Early life and education ==
Rivera grew up outside Rochester, New York. Rivera received her BFA from the Art Institute of Boston and her MFA from the School of Visual Arts in New York, where she developed an interest in the social history of photography and how identity, sexuality, and gender evolve in relation to material culture.

Rivera worked in the collections at the Burns Archive and the Museum of the City of New York, where she also has taught.

== Career ==
=== Photography ===
Mirror with Jewels (2015), from Rivera's Beautiful Boy series.

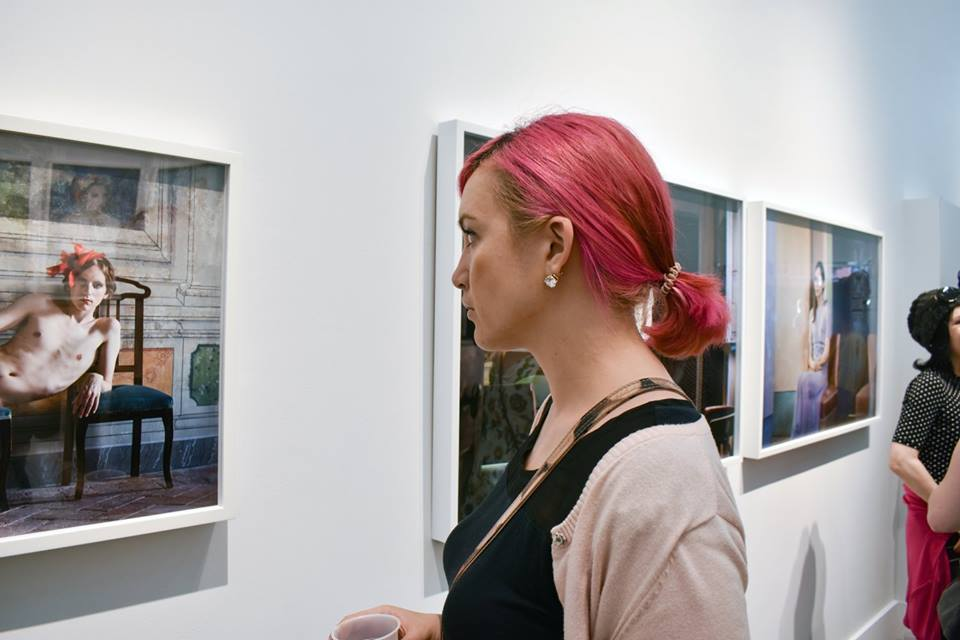
Gallery director Sherri Littlefield views a photograph from Rivera's Beautiful Boy series at ClampArt.

Rivera's photographic work explores the construction of gender and identity through staged portraiture. Her Beautiful Boy series, which began in 2014, features Rivera's genderqueer partner BJ Lillis in vintage women's clothing within period interiors, performing various feminine personae. The series references old master paintings, classic Hollywood cinema, and the photography of Cecil Beaton, Cindy Sherman, and Larry Sultan.

Collaboration between a cisgender female photographer and a genderqueer subject is central to the series. Beautiful Boy's vintage aesthetic evokes Eisenhower-era femininity while its gender politics are contemporary. Because the images are made collaboratively, Lillis is an active participant in his (Note: In 2017, Lillis stated, "I use masculine pronouns, I have a male body, but I also enjoy being feminine.") own representation rather than a passive object of the male gaze, and his evident pleasure in the personae comes through in the photographs.

Her following series, The Silence of Spaces (2018), was photographed in a former seminary. The images show both Rivera and Lillis in compositions that echo Renaissance art, suggesting that exploring archetypes of the feminine engages both participants beyond a single gender identity.

Rivera is represented by ClampArt in New York. Her work is included in the permanent collections of the Danforth Art, Kennedy Museum of Art, Museum of Fine Arts, Houston, and Newport Art Museum.

=== Curation ===
Rivera served as Associate Curator at the Museum of Sex in New York.

She co-curated NSFW Female Gaze (2017) with VICE's Marina Garcia-Vasquez, an exhibition exploring women's sexual perspectives and desire through photography, illustration, and film. She curated Canon: Juan José Barboza-Gubo & Andrew Mroczek (2017–2018), the museum's first bilingual exhibition, designed to reach New York's Spanish-speaking audience. In 2018, she curated Leonor Fini: Theatre of Desire, the first U.S. museum survey of the Surrealist artist's work, including paintings, film, furniture, costume, and set designs. (Note: Rivera has cited Fini's work as an influence on her own practice, particularly Fini's inversion of traditional gender roles by depicting men in vulnerable, feminized positions and empowering female subjects through mythological imagery.)

=== Filmmaking ===
In 2024, Rivera served as producer on the HBO documentary series Chimp Crazy. The series was nominated for Emmy Awards for Outstanding Writing and Outstanding Picture Editing.

== Personal life ==
Rivera's partner is BJ Lillis, who is genderqueer and has been the subject of Rivera's photographic work.

== Exhibitions ==
Solo

- 2017: Modern Love, ClampArt, New York
- 2017: Beautiful Boy, ClampArt, New York
- 2018: Beautiful Boy, Newport Art Museum, Newport, Rhode Island
- 2018: Beautiful Boy, Millbrook School, Millbrook, New York

Group

- 2017: NSFW Female Gaze, Museum of Sex, New York (co-curator and exhibiting artist)
- 2017: Non-Binary, Centre Never Apart, Montreal
- 2019: Transamerica/n: Gender, Identity, Appearance Today, McNay Art Museum, San Antonio, Texas
- 2019: American Truth, SVA Chelsea Gallery, New York
- 2019: Photography After Stonewall, Soho Photo Gallery, New York

== Recognition ==
- 2008: National Museum of Women in Arts, "Woman to Watch"
- 2016: Griffin Museum Peter Urban Legacy Award
- 2016: Feature Shoot Emerging Photography Award
- 2017: D&AD Next Photographer Shortlist
- 2017: Magnum Photography Awards, Winner, Portrait Category
