= Chimp Crazy =

2024 American documentary series

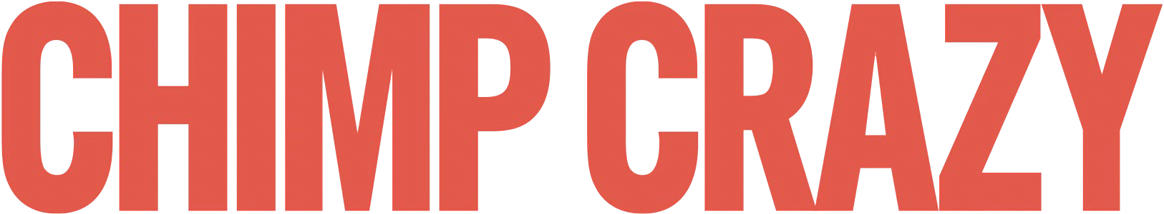
- Genre: Documentary
- Written by: Eric Goode; Jeremy McBride; Evan Wise; Tim Moran; Charles Divak; Adrienne Gits; Doug Abel
- Directed by: Eric Goode
- Music by: Jonathan Sadoff
- Country of origin: United States
- Original language: English
- No. of episodes: 4

Production
- Executive producers: Eric Goode; Jeremy McBride; Nancy Abraham; Lisa Heller; Tina Nguyen
- Producers: Lissa Rivera; Evan Wise; Tim Moran; Adrienne Gits; Charles Divak; Doug Abel; James Liu; Carissa Ridgeway; Dwayne Cunningham
- Cinematography: Ryan Nethery; Chris Messina; Benji Lanpher; Gabe Mayhan; Clint Byrne
- Editors: Evan Wise; Charles Divak; Adrienne Gits; Doug Abel
- Running time: 54-58 minutes
- Production companies: HBO Documentary Films; Goode Films

Original release
- Network: HBO
- Release: August 18 – September 8, 2024

Chimp Crazy is an American documentary series directed and produced by Eric Goode. It follows Tonia Haddix, whose love for a chimpanzee spins into a wild game with authorities and the animal rights group PETA.

It premiered on August 18, 2024, on HBO.

== Premise ==
Tonia Haddix, an animal broker, spends her days taking care of a chimpanzee, Tonka. Her love for Tonka spins into a game with authorities and an animal rights group, PETA. The series additionally explores other owners of nonhuman primates and their experiences.

== Episodes ==
No.	Title	Directed by	Original release date
1	"Monkey Love"	Eric Goode	August 18, 2024
Tonia Haddix is a former nurse and a collector of primates who has recently taken over the Missouri Primate Foundation, a facility embroiled in a lawsuit with PETA for alleged animal welfare abuses. Haddix describes her unique love for Tonka, an adult chimpanzee she met in 2018 when she took over the facility from founder Connie Casey. Following a court order that the chimpanzees must be turned over to a sanctuary, federal marshals come to collect the chimps but are unable to find Tonka.
2	"Gone Ape"	Eric Goode	August 25, 2024
PETA conducts a search for Tonka, whom Tonia Haddix claims has died. Tonia appears in online court and tells the judge that she had him cremated. A side story portrays incidents surrounding Travis, one of the pet chimpanzees previously sold by the Missouri Primate Foundation. The episode ends by revealing that Tonka is alive and living in a cage in Tonia Haddix's basement.
3	"Head Shot"	Eric Goode	September 1, 2024
Tonia Haddix describes how she transported Tonka to her home, keeping him overnight in a Holiday Inn bathroom. Proxy Director Dwayne Cunningham, who has developed a friendship with Tonia, seeks out legal advice on her behalf. Cunningham's lawyer makes the unorthodox suggestion that she could kill the chimp and make the whole matter disappear. A side story features the case of Buck, a chimpanzee whose owner, Tamara Brogoitti, had also been in a dispute with PETA. That case ended when Buck attacked Brogoitti's daughter, prompting Brogoitti to call the police and have them come kill the chimp. Cunningham later receives a call from Haddix telling him that Tonka is very sick and that she has made an appointment with a veterinarian to have Tonka euthanized. The filmmakers ultimately decide to intervene before Tonka can be put down; they inform PETA of Tonka's location.
4	"Fantasy Island"	Eric Goode	September 8, 2024
After the filmmakers tell PETA about Tonka's situation, federal marshals come to Tonia Haddix's house to take him to Save the Chimps. Haddix finds out that Eric Goode of Tiger King is behind the film production and is angry. A few months later, she meets him and softens her opposition. She invites the film crew to her exotic petting zoo and tells Goode about getting attacked by a friend's chimpanzee, who bit off a piece of her ear and dislocated her shoulder. A side story reveals that Sandra Herald, the owner of Travis, sought to purchase a baby chimpanzee to console herself in the wake of Travis's death. Tonka, upon transferring to Save the Chimps, regains mental and physical health after a 60-day quarantine. He receives a healthy diet, sunshine, and makes new chimp friends.

== Production ==
Eric Goode was intrigued by people who raised pet monkeys and chimpanzees as their children. Initially, Goode wanted to focus on Connie Casey of the Missouri Primate Foundation, however, Casey declined an interview. Following the success of Tiger King, dealers in exotic animals became hesitant to speak with Goode, who they felt portrayed them in a negative light. For this production, Goode hired Dwayne Cunningham, a former circus clown and animal trainer, to pose as a "pro-ownership" filmmaker to approach Haddix. Haddix later told Rolling Stone that she would have never participated in the documentary if she knew Eric Goode was involved. Yet even after finding out Goode's role, Haddix continued to participate and let Goode interview her for over a year.

== Background ==
The Missouri Primate Foundation featured in Chimp Crazy has roots in a 1960s pet shop owned by Connie Braun Casey, Braun's Barn, in Festus, Missouri. Though Casey had been collecting exotic animals for years, she bought her first chimp in 1972. In a 2018 interview, Casey talked about her decision to find a dealer to buy "wild caught" chimps before the Endangered Species Act went into effect. Casey bought two chimps and bred them, selling babies for $40,000 up to $65,000. She started a business, Chimparty, renting out baby chimps for children's birthday parties, nursing homes, and TV and film productions.

In 1992, one of the chimps owned by Casey bit off her husband's nose. Concerned about negative press coverage, Connie Casey started a nonprofit, Missouri Primate Foundation, while continuing to run Chimparty and selling primate pets. The Missouri Primate Foundation took in adult chimps previously sold as pets or retired from show business.

In 2001, a 28-year-old chimp named Suzy escaped and was shot and killed by Jason Coats, a 17-year-old who lived next door. Connie Casey took out a newspaper ad to "Make sure Suzy's killer is punished!" Coats was charged with felony property damage and misdemeanor animal abuse. Casey also posted a sign in her yard blaming Coats for the killing and providing his address. The documentary crew interviewed Coats for Chimp Crazy but his story didn't make it to the final edit.

Suzy had given birth to a total of six chimps, including Travis, who made national headlines in 2009 when he mauled a woman in Connecticut and was shot by police.

In 2016, an employee at the primate facility, Angela Scott, contacted PETA to express concerns about abuse she had witnessed at work. Scott secretly shot video and sent it to the animal rights group before quitting her job there. PETA had already been investigating the facility, following a string of USDA violations. PETA filed a lawsuit in December 2016, citing violations of the Endangered Species Act. This lawsuit becomes the centerpiece of events covered in Chimp Crazy.

While Casey was embroiled in the battle with PETA, Tonia Haddix came to visit her seeking to buy a baby chimp. When she heard about Casey's legal problems, she offered to take over the facility in an effort to disrupt the lawsuit. So, in 2018, instead of adopting a baby chimp, Haddix adopted the Missouri Primate Foundation, including an adult chimp that Haddix had taken a liking to, Tonka.

Tonka was born at Working Wildlife and rented out for movies such as Buddy and George of the Jungle. After retiring from show business, he was transferred to Casey/Haddix's facility and used to breed. At that facility, Tonka had been isolated after fights with other males. A vet for the Missouri facility said he performed surgery twice on Tonka to seal wounds from those fights.

Connie Casey was the Chimp Crazy team's initial choice as the subject for the film, but she declined to appear on camera, so they focused on Tonia Haddix.

== Aftermath ==
As a result of the PETA lawsuit, authorities sent six of the former Missouri Primate Foundation chimpanzees to the Center for Great Apes, an accredited sanctuary in Florida. This includes:

- Candy (breeding partner of Tonka)
- Connor (a model for Hallmark greeting cards; Candy's brother)
- Kerry (Tonka's son)
- Mikayla (Tonka's daughter)
- Chloe (Tonka and Candy's daughter)
- Tammy (another breeding partner of Tonka)

Before the chimps' arrival, the center housed five other chimpanzees born at the Missouri facility and sold as pets, including Tammy's son. Thus, the new arrivals were able to meet siblings and other family members for the first time.

Connor, the chimp rented out for Hallmark greeting cards, was diagnosed with advanced bladder cancer and died. On its Facebook page, the Center posted that Connie Casey (of Missouri Primate Foundation) "was notified as soon as the diagnosis was made, and she visited him at the sanctuary to be with him during his final days."

As a result of being held in Tonia Haddix's basement for several months, Tonka was unable to secure a spot with his family members at the sanctuary, which by then had no more vacancies. Instead, Tonka was sent to a different sanctuary in Florida, Save the Chimps. (Both Center for Great Apes and Save the Chimps are accredited by the Global Federation of Animal Sanctuaries.)

Tonka's move to Save the Chimps was deemed successful. Despite arriving at the sanctuary pale and overweight, veterinarians found that he did not have any heart problems or other serious issues. During his initial 60-day quarantine, Tonka was filmed in a YouTube video playing chase with Jacob, a fellow chimp in quarantine in the adjacent enclosure. Tonka quickly developed a friendship with Jacob and another male chimp, Cayleb, who turned out to be Tonka's son. Lisa Marie, a female in a different group at the sanctuary, is also Tonka's offspring.

Tonka was eventually placed in Doug's family group on one of Save the Chimps' 12 island habitats. According to the group's website, Tonka's favorite things are sunshine, painting, juice, and fleece blankets.

Save the Chimps gives male chimps vasectomies to prevent them from reproducing while allowing them to enjoy their natural appetites. A representative from the sanctuary reported that Tonka is "very interested in the females" and "quite a ladies' man."

In the month after Chimp Crazy aired, donations to Save the Chimps doubled and website traffic increased 7000%.

=== Activism ===
Several animal welfare, animal rights, and primatologist groups have used the docuseries release as a news peg to promote the Captive Primate Safety Act. Sen. Richard Blumenthal (D-CT) held a press conference to raise awareness of the bill, suggesting that the "renewed conversations around primate ownership" sparked by Chimp Crazy could prompt Congress to act. This federal legislation, if passed, would prohibit the private ownership of primates as pets in the United States. (Tiger King prompted similar legislation for big cats.) A December 2023 review found that the "U.S. ranked third out of 171 countries in the ease of purchasing a pet primate online, behind Indonesia and Vietnam."

=== Tonia Haddix ===
In October 2024, PETA filed a new motion accusing Tonia Haddix of perjury and violating previous court orders, citing Chimp Crazy as evidence. In March 2025, Haddix pleaded guilty to charges of perjury and obstruction of justice and the USDA revoked her license to operate a roadside zoo.

In July 2025, Tonia Haddix was arrested after she failed to pay over $224,000 in court and lawyer fees required by a U.S. District Court ruling. When searching her house, officials discovered that she was keeping another "secret chimp" in her basement, and the animal was removed. A St. Louis County Court order mandated that Haddix be held in jail until a hearing on August 5, 2025. Subsequently, Haddix was sentenced to 46 months in prison after pleading guilty to perjury and obstruction of justice.

== Reception ==
Chimp Crazy netted over 2 million viewers within its first week of release, putting it on pace to be the most viewed HBO docuseries since 2020's McMillions.

=== Critical reception ===
On Rotten Tomatoes, the show is "certified fresh" with an approval rating of 86%, based on 29 critic reviews, with an average audience rating of 8.8/10. On Metacritic, it has a weighted average score of 67 out of 100 based on 11 reviews.

== Awards and nominations ==
Year	Award	Category	Recipients	Result	Ref.
2024	HPA Awards	Outstanding Sound - Documentary	Roberto Fernandez	Nominated	
2025	American Cinema Editors Awards	Best Edited Documentary Series	Evan Wise, ACE, Charles Divak, ACE, Adrienne Gits, ACE, Doug Abel, ACE	Won	
2025	Primetime Emmy Awards	Outstanding Picture Editing for a Nonfiction Program	Evan Wise, ACE, Charles Divak, ACE, Adrienne Gits, ACE, Doug Abel, ACE, Sascha Stanton-Craven	Nominated	
2025	Primetime Emmy Awards	Outstanding Writing for a Nonfiction Program	Eric Goode, Jeremy McBride, Evan Wise, Tim Moran, Adrienne Gits, Charles Divak, Doug Abel	Nominated	
