= Pet monkey =

Monkey kept as a pet

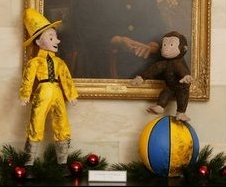
"The Man with The Yellow Hat" and Curious George, the pet monkey, are enduring characters in books, comics, film and television.

A pet monkey is a monkey kept as a pet. Monkeys are beloved for their entertainment value, resemblance to humans, and human-like abilities. However, primatologists, zoologists, veterinarians, and conservationists oppose the keeping of primates as pets due to the animals' welfare, public health and safety, and conservation of endangered species.

== Legal aspects ==
In the United States, most states restrict monkey ownership, whether via licensing requirements or outright bans, but, as of 2016, 13 states allow it. The United Kingdom passed new legislation in 2024 that makes it illegal to own a monkey without a license. The Captive Primate Safety Act, a bill before the 118th Congress, would have a similar impact in the US if passed.

The European Union, the Netherlands, Bulgaria, Italy, Portugal, Latvia, Lithuania, Estonia and Hungary have bans on the keeping of primates.

Internationally, government policies on the primate trade are shaped by the Convention on International Trade in Endangered Species of Wild Fauna and Flora (CITES), a treaty signed by 184 countries to prevent the exploitation of wild animals and plants.

== History ==
Monkeys have been kept as pets for centuries, though, in the West, up through the 19th century, ownership was mostly limited to the wealthy — notably, royalty — and to those in the business of entertainment.

When the British first began to explore Africa, young monkeys were often captured and taken back on board the ship to entertain sailors. For example, a Senegal monkey was kept as a pet by a ship's cook in the 19th century and entertained passengers with its antics.

Around the turn of the 20th century in the US, owning monkeys became a social fad, a pattern that would repeat over the course of the century, often spiking as a result of media anthropomorphizing monkeys and normalizing their suitability as pets. In the mid-1910s, for example, dancer and fashion trendsetter Irene Castle was seen publicly and in photos with a pet monkey, inspiring fans to seek similar pets. A 1930 news story noted monkeys' popularity with "society folks," referring to monkeys as providing a " ' delightful background' for the summer parties." Similar trends of monkeys as fashion objects were seen in Europe as well.

As the price of monkeys declined over time, more people purchased them as pets. The market for monkeys in the US skyrocketed in the late 1950s and 1960s. Demand in the U.S. for pet monkeys was so great that in 1955 government officials in Costa Rica expressed concern that it was decimating wild populations there. According to the Simian Society, there were 750,000 pet monkeys in the US in 1971—more than the number of registered poodles. But monkeys proved to be much more difficult than poodles to care for. Of the estimated 40,000 monkeys sold each year, roughly 36,000 died within a year. In Los Angeles, health officials expressed concern regarding the "recent own-your-own monkey fad."

While many people enjoyed owning monkeys in their infancy, they found that the animals become unmanageable — “wild” — upon reaching adolescence. In the late 1960s, the first monkey sanctuaries appeared in the US, providing an option for unwanted pets. Access to sanctuaries was limited, however. As a sanctuary founder in Texas stated, his facility can only help "a fraction" of the monkeys who are abused or abandoned: "It's not the kind of work that there will ever be a solution to." Other popular options for unloading unwanted pets included euthanizing the animal or keeping it caged and removing its teeth.

== As service animals for the disabled ==
Starting in 1979, a Boston-based group called Helping Hands trained capuchin monkeys as monkey helpers to assist quadriplegics and other people with severe spinal cord injuries or mobility impairments. Helping Hands shifted away from using monkeys and instead focused on assistive technologies in 2022.

== Famous pet monkey owners ==
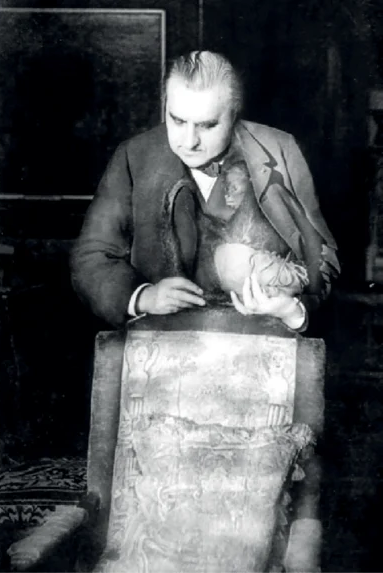
Jean-Martin Charcot with Rosalie

- Jean-Martin Charcot, French neurologist known as "the father of modern neurology", kept a female tufted capuchin named Rosalie as a pet.

== In popular culture ==
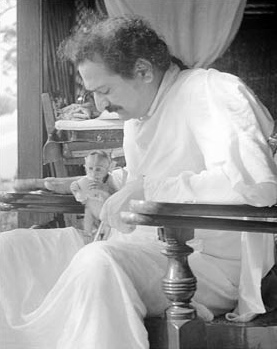
Mystic and spiritual master Meher Baba with his pet monkey named Lucky in India (c. 1940). The monkey had been given to him by Princess Norina Matchabelli.

Pet monkeys appear in fictional and nonfictional popular media, including books, television programs, and movies. Sun Wukong (the "Monkey King"), a character who figures prominently in Chinese mythology, is the main protagonist in the classic comic Chinese novel Journey to the West. The television series Monkey, the literary characters Monsieur Eek and Curious George are all examples. The winged monkeys are prominent characters in The Wizard of Oz.

Chimpanzees, gorillas and orangutans are often referred to as monkeys; however, they are apes. Terry Pratchett makes use of the distinction in his Discworld novels, in which the Librarian of the Unseen University is an orangutan who gets very violent if referred to as a monkey.

=== Famous fictional pet monkeys ===
There have been many famous pet monkeys with Tarzan's Cheeta arguably the first famous pet "monkey" although they continued to live in the jungle. Nkima was the original Cheeta-like character in Edgar Rice Burroughs' Tarzan novels, and in adaptations of the saga to other media, particularly comics. Tarzan and Cheeta have been repeated across all major popular culture mediums including books, films, television, games and comics. Katie, a white-headed capuchin, played Marcel in the popular U.S. series Friends and also Los Angeles Angels' mascot "Rally Monkey." Finster played Harvey Keitel's pet thief, Dodger in the movie Monkey Trouble. Frankie the Monkey has been seen in Sean-Paul and Juliane's magic act all over the country.

=== Curious George ===
Curious George is the protagonist of a popular children's books franchise by the same name, written by Hans Augusto Rey and Margret Rey. The books feature a curious pet monkey named George, who is brought from his home in Africa by "The Man with The Yellow Hat" to live with him in a big city. Around the world, the adventures of Curious George have been translated in many languages. The character has spawned books in many languages, two television series, two stop-motion animated shorts, an animated film, Curious George, featuring Will Ferrell, a video game and he has been linked with numerous products and companies.

=== List of fictional pet monkeys ===
Literature

- Ampersand is the name of Yorick Brown's pet monkey in the comic book series Y: The Last Man.
- Chee-Chee is the pet companion of Doctor Dolittle, created by Hugh Lofting.
- In A Little Princess, the heroine finds and returns Carrisford's pet monkey

Animation

- Abu is the pet in Disney's Aladdin
- Beppo was Superman's pet monkey.
- Bippy, a small monkey who accompanies Timmy Turner in the first Fairly Oddparents movie Abra-Catastrophe!
- Boots is the pet explorer in Dora the Explorer
- Chim-Chim is the pet monkey of Speed Racer and his family
- Mojo was Homer Simpson's helper monkey who eventually adopts Homer's unhealthy lifestyle and becomes very obese
- Mr. Twitchy from Rated A for Awesome was the pet of a group of four 12-year-old kids who are the main protagonists of the series
- So-So is the pet sidekick of Peter Potamus, from Hanna-Barbera.
- Tenshin is Meirin Kanzaki's pet monkey in Ask Dr. Rin!

Film

- Dodger is the trained pickpocket monkey from Monkey Trouble (1994).
- Bonzo is the chimpanzee who Ronald Reagan takes care of in Bedtime for Bonzo (1951)
- Mona is a monkey who accompanies two astronauts to Mars in Robinson Crusoe on Mars (1964).
- Spike is Ace Ventura's monkey companion in Ace Ventura: Pet Detective (1994) and Ace Ventura: When Nature Calls (1995).
- Monkey is Dante's pet monkey in Grandma's Boy
- Jack the Monkey is Captain Barbossa's pet capuchin monkey named after Jack Sparrow in the Pirates of the Caribbean franchise.
- Caesar is Will Rodman's chimpanzee in Rise of the Planet of the Apes (2011).
- The couple that John Cusack and Cameron Diaz's characters form in Being John Malkovich (1999) have a pet monkey.
- Norma Desmond owns a chimpanzee prior to the beginning of Sunset Boulevard (1950). The chimpanzee's death, in a roundabout way, prompts Desmond to take on Joe Gillis as a kept man.

Television

- Debbie the Bloop (named for the unusual sound it made) was the chimpanzee with very long ears from the first season of Lost in Space.
- Klaus was Dieter's touchable monkey on the Saturday Night Live skit "Sprockets"
- Joey and Davey Monkey – on Sesame Street
- Jonny the Monkey is "the most famous celebrity in Kazakhstan" according to Borat in many of his interviews and introduced as Kazakhstan's "most successful actor" by Borat in an opening skit of "Saturday Night Live" in November 2006.
- Marcel was Ross' pet monkey on the TV show Friends.

== See also ==
- Travis, a male chimpanzee raised and owned by Sandra Herold of Stamford, Connecticut who attacked and mauled Herold's friend, then shot and killed by police in 2009
- Darwin aka. "Ikea Monkey", a Japanese macaque owned by Yasmin Nakhuda of Toronto, Ontario who escaped his cage in an IKEA parking lot in 2012, captured without incident by Toronto Animal Services on that day and relinquished to an animal sanctuary
