= Sage Sohier =

American photographer and educator

- Born: Washington, D.C., United States
- Education: Harvard University,
- Known for: Photography
- Movement: American art, Modern Art

Sage Sohier is an American photographer and educator.

== Biography ==
Sohier teaches photography for years in different educational institutions, serving as assistant professor in Massachusetts College of Art. She was lecturer on Visual and Environmental Studies in Harvard University from 1991 till 2003, Assistant Professor of Art in Wellesley College from 1997 till 1999. She was also teaching in Rhode Island School of Design, Massachusetts College of Art and School of the Boston Museum of Fine Arts.

Sage Sohier works are part of many public collections, including Addison Gallery of American Art, Brooklyn Museum of Art, Cleveland Museum of Art, DeCordova Museum, Fogg Art Museum, MIT List Visual Arts Center, Boston Museum of Fine Arts, Houston Museum of Fine Arts, New York Museum of Modern Art, Nelson-Atkins Museum of Art, Portland Art Museum, Princeton University Art Museum, Rose Art Museum, San Francisco Museum of Modern Art.

Sage Sohier received a lot of publicity for her series of gay couples in home environment. She started to work on this project in 1980 at the time of the AIDS crisis.

== Awards ==
- Massachusetts Artists Foundation photography fellowship, 1979
- National Endowment for the Arts photography fellowship, 1980-1981
- John Simon Guggenheim Memorial Foundation fellowship, 1984-1985
- Massachusetts Council on the Arts and Humanities “Massproductions“ grant, 1987-1989
- Massachusetts Artists Foundation photography fellowship, 1989
- No Strings Foundation grant, 2008-2009

== Exhibitions ==
=== Solo ===
- Gallery "Arte Contemporaneo," Mexico City, 1986
- The Tartt Gallery, Washington, D.C., 1986
- Blue Sky Gallery, Portland, OR, 1988, "At Home with Themselves"
- San Francisco Camerawork, 1988, "At Home with Themselves"
- Vision Gallery, Boston, MA, 1988, "At Home with Themselves"
- Addison Gallery of American Art, Andover, MA, 1990, "At Home with Themselves"
- Museum of Contemporary Photography, Columbia College, Chicago IL, 1990, "At Home with Themselves"
- The Houston Center for Photography, 1990, "At Home with Themselves"
- Blue Sky Gallery, Portland, OR, 1994, "Peaceable Kingdom"
- Retrospective, University of Akron, OH, 1997
- Hampshire College, Amherst, MA, 1998
- Bernard Toale Gallery, Boston, MA, 2004, "Perfectible Worlds"
- The Center for Photography at Woodstock, NY, 2006, "Perfectible Worlds"
- Blue Sky Gallery, Portland, OR, 2007, "Perfectible Worlds"
- Foley Gallery, New York, NY, 2008, "Perfectible Worlds"
- Houston Center for Photography, 2008, "Perfectible Worlds"
- San Francisco Airport Museum, 2009, "Perfectible Worlds"
- Jerome Liebling Center, Hampshire College, November 2013, "About Face"
- Blue Sky Gallery, Portland, OR, August, 2013, "About Face"
- Foley Gallery, New York, NY, April, 2013, "About Face."
- Carroll and Sons gallery, Boston, MA, January 2013, "About Face"
- Blue Sky Gallery, Portland, OR, October, 2014, "At Home With Themselves: Same-Sex Couples in 1980s America"
- Carroll and Sons Gallery, Boston, MA, February–March 2015, "At Home With Themselves: Same-Sex Couples in 1980s America"
- Foley Gallery, New York, NY, November - January 2018, "Witness to Beauty"
- Foley Gallery, New York, NY, April - May 2019, "Immersed and Submerged"

=== Group ===
- Addison Gallery of American Art, Andover, MA, 1982, "New England Perambulations"
- Light Gallery, NY, 1982, "New Women/New Work"
- Museum of Modern Art, NY, 1984, Photographs from the Collection/Opening of the new galleries
- Institute of Contemporary Art, Boston, MA, 1985, "Boston Now Photography"
- Aperture traveling exhibition, 1987, "Mothers and Daughters"
- Art Institute of Chicago, 1989, "American Stories", three-person show.
- Berlin Art Institute, Berlin, Germany, 1988, "AIDS" exhibition
- The Tartt Gallery, Washington, D.C., 1991, four-person show
- Museum of Modern Art, NY, 1991, "Pleasures and Terrors of Domestic Comfort"
- Basel Art Fair 1994
- The Friends of Photography, San Francisco, 1996, "Secrets"
- Davis Museum, Wellesley College, 1996, "Rules of the Game"
- Wooster Gardens (Brent Sikkema) Gallery, New York, 1996, three-person show
- Bernard Toale Gallery, 1999, "Boston Women in Photography"
- The DeCordova Museum, Lincoln, MA, 2000–2001, "Photography in Boston, 1955-85"
- Addison Gallery of American Art, Andover, MA, 2001, "In the Street: Photography from the Collection"
- International Center of Photography, New York, NY, 2003, "How Human: Life in the Post-Genome Era"
- Kathleen Ewing Gallery, Washington, D.C, 2004, "Dog Days Dog Show"
- The DeCordova Museum, Lincoln, MA, 2004, "Self-Evidence: Identity in Contemporary Art"
- Clifford Art Gallery, Colgate University, Hamilton, NY, 2005, "Suddenly Older"
- Photographic Resource Center, Boston, MA, 2005–2006, "Group Portrait"
- Carroll and Sons, Boston, MA, 2010, "Familiar Bodies"
- Museum of Modern Art, New York, NY, 2010–2011, "Pictures by Women: A History of Modern Photography"
- Nicolaysen Art Museum, Casper, WY, 2011, "Living History"
- Nelson-Atkins Museum, Kansas City, MO, August, 2013, "About Face: Contemporary Portraiture"
- Portland Art Museum, Portland, OR, October 2014-January 2015, "Blue Sky: The Oregon Center for the Photographic Arts at 40"
