= Edith Lesley =

American academic and founder of Lesley University (1872–1953)

Edith Lesley (27 January 1872 – 16 May 1953^{1}) was an American educator and founder of Lesley University. She was the elder daughter of Alonzo and Rebecca (Cousens) Lesley.

== Early life ==
Edith Lesley was born in a part of Colombia that became part of Panama, in the area then called Panama State. She and her family continued living there until about 1874 when her family moved to Bangor, Maine; Alonzo Lesley had grown up in nearby Carmel, Maine and Rebecca Cousens Lesley was from Trenton, Maine.^{2} Alonzo Lesley worked as a shoemaker in Bangor. Edith's sister Olive May Lesley was born in December, 1875 in Bangor.^{3}

Edith Lesley attended public elementary school in Bangor.^{4} It is not clear whether she graduated from Bangor High School, or instead attended private classes with Helen L. Newman, who opened Miss Newman's School in Bangor in about 1890.^{5} From the late 1870s Rebecca Lesley took in boarders, first at the family's rented home at 7 Adams Street, Bangor, and later at their home at One Broadway.^{6}

In 1891 the Lesley family moved to Boston, Massachusetts before settling permanently in Cambridge, Massachusetts. Alonzo Lesley continued to work as a shoemaker.^{7} At some time between 1891 and about 1898, Edith Lesley received training in kindergarten education at the Anne L. Page Kindergarten School, Boston, which followed the precepts of Friedrich Wilhelm August Fröbel, widely credited as the inventor of the concept of the kindergarten and an advocate of early childhood education. By 1898 both she and her sister Olive were working as kindergarten teachers at the Riverside School in Cambridge. Later both moved to the Houghton School (which replaced the Riverside).^{8}

Between 1904 and 1908 Edith Lesley attended Radcliffe College as a special student, studying philosophy with Josiah Royce, Hugo Munsterberg, and George Herbert Palmer.^{9} She may have taken these classes to prepare to open her school.

== The Lesley School ==
In 1909, Edith Lesley founded The Lesley School in Cambridge, Massachusetts. In its early years the school was also called The Lesley Normal School, the term "normal" based on the French école normale supérieure, a school to educate teachers. The purpose of the school was to train young women in the classic kindergarten methods of German educator Friedrich Fröbel; most of the students took a two-year course of study. The school enrolled nine students in its first year, and charged $100 in tuition. Most of the classes were taught by Edith and Olive Lesley, with a few part-time instructors to teach specialty classes.

The school was at first a part-time venture for Edith and her sister Olive, who both continued to teach in the Cambridge public schools. By 1912, with growing enrollments, she appears to have resigned from her teaching job to devote her full attention to The Lesley School.^{10} The school added training for the early primary grades, and in 1917 opened a Household Arts department. Enrollment grew rapidly in the 1920s, peaking at well over 300 students.

In 1912, Edith Lesley married Merl Ruskin Wolfard, an engineer.^{11} Merl Wolfard later participated closely in the expansion of the school, buying several of the properties that became dormitories for the boarding students. Olive Lesley left the school in about 1914, first to work with Wilfred Grenfell in Labrador, then as a proponent of the Girl Scouts of the USA, and finally journeying to France to work in war relief during World War I. She remained in Europe for the balance of her life.

In 1914, Edith Lesley Wolfard hired Getrude Malloch, a kindergarten teacher with experience in both Boston and Cambridge schools, as a part-time instructor. Miss Malloch rapidly moved into administration as well as continuing to teach, and frequently accompanied Mrs. Wolfard in her travels and professional work on behalf of kindergarten education. Both became life members and worked on behalf of the International Kindergarten Union (IKU; now the Association of Childhood Education International).

Edith Lesley purchased the 29 Everett Street house her family had long rented in 1915, turning it into the headquarters of The Lesley School.^{12} A few years later the Wolfards added a one-story brick addition to 29 Everett St. for classes and student boarding, and began to buy up neighboring properties, turning them into dormitories. In 1928-29 the school was rebuilt with a garden and quadrangle between Everett and Mellen Streets, giving the residential campus the form it still has today.

The Lesley School gained a reputation for solid teacher preparation focused on extensive experience; graduates readily found employment across the state as well as in other regions of the country. The school's leaders and faculty kept up with changes in teacher education requirements and philosophy, adding a three-year course, more liberal arts, and refining pedagogic methods and theory. Edith Lesley Wolfard continued to set the general direction of the school, and she and husband Merl Wolfard divided the profits of the business; Gertrude Malloch, as Associate Principal and later Principal, was the de facto administrative head of the school.

Edith Lesley Wolfard traveled extensively in the United States, including the territories of Hawaii and Alaska, as well as in Europe, collecting artifacts to add to the educational and cultural experience of Lesley School students.

Enrollments declined in the mid-1930s as a result of the Great Depression, while Edith Lesley Wolfard began to struggle with chronic illness. In 1938, she received an honorary master's degree from Suffolk University, which in many ways marked the end of her active involvement in education.

== Transition and the establishment of Lesley College ==
The Wolfards, Gertrude Malloch and investor John Gordon created a trust and attempted to run the Lesley School on this basis from 1938 to about 1940; however the school continued to struggle with enrollments. The school incorporated in 1941 as a non-profit institution, and petitioned Massachusetts to be able offer the bachelor's degree. This petition was granted in 1943. In 1944 The Lesley School officially became Lesley College, the founding institution and now the undergraduate college of Lesley University. While Edith Lesley Wolfard remained a trustee until 1947, her direct involvement in the school had ended by 1941.

The Wolfards continued to live at 29 Everett Street until Edith Lesley Wolfard's death in 1953. Merl Wolfard remained a corporator at the college until his death in 1964.

== Notes ==
^{1}Death certificate, Edith Wolfard, Certificate 487688, Registry of Vital Records and Statistics, Department of Public Health, Boston, Massachusetts, filed May 19, 1953.
^{2} Alonzo Leslie, City of Bangor for 1875-6. Greenough & Co., Bangor: David Bugbee, 1875. Place of birth of Alonzo Lesley: Death record, Mass. Vital Records, Massachusetts State Archives, Boston, Massachusetts, v. 517, p. 396. Residence of Rebecca Cousens: 1850 U.S. Census, Trenton, Hancock Co., Maine; Roll: M432_255; Page: 276; Image: 123, head of household John Cousens.
^{3}Vital Records of Bangor, Maine, v. 1.
^{4} Graduation from elementary school: "Bangor Grammar Schools: Graduate Exercises of the Class of ’87,” Bangor Daily Whig and Courier, June 27, 1887.
^{5}Her obituary in the Bangor newspaper states she graduated from Bangor High School ("Mrs. Merl R. Wolfard," Bangor Daily News, May 19, 1953, p. 5). However self-reported records from earlier in her life cite Miss Newman as the source of her high school education.
^{6} See household listing, 1880 U.S. Census, Bangor, Penobscot County, Maine, Ward 1, Roll: T9_485; Family History Film: 1254485, p. 97.4000, Enumeration District 25, head of house Alonso Leslie [sic].
^{7} Cambridge, Massachusetts Directory, 1891. Published Cambridge, Massachusetts
^{8} Various Cambridge, Massachusetts directories, 1898-1911.
^{9} Letter from Jane Knowles, Radcliffe College, to Hannah Roberts, Lesley College, September 9, 1985, recording four years of registrations by Edith Lesley.
^{10} Cambridge, Massachusetts Directory, 1912. Published in Cambridge, Massachusetts
^{11} Marriage record, Merl Wolfard and Edith Leslie [sic], Massachusetts Vital Records, 1912, v. 611, p. 363, Massachusetts State Archives, Boston, Massachusetts
^{12} Edith L. Wolfard of Cambridge, Mass., buyer, purchases 29 Everett Street “for consideration paid” from John Robert Edwards Sumner and Abby Page Sumner both of Colorado Springs, Colorado, on July 16, 1915. Middlesex County Deeds, Cambridge, Massachusetts, v 3984, p. 195.
