= Ina Jang =

Korean photographer in New York

- Born: 1982 (age 43–44); South Korea
- Occupation: Photographer

Korean name
- Hangul: 장인아
- Hanja: 張仁雅
- RR: Jang Ina
- MR: Chang Ina

Ina Jang (born 1982, South Korea) is a photographer based out of Brooklyn, New York. She received her BFA in photography in 2010 from the School of the Visual Arts in New York City. Ina Jang is represented by Foley Gallery.

== Photographs ==
Jang's work was featured in The New Yorker in 2018.

== Exhibitions ==
=== Solo exhibitions ===
2018

UTOPIA, Foley Gallery, New York, NY

2017

- UTOPIA, Christophe Guye Galerie, Zurich (Switzerland)

2011

- SO, TOO & VERY, Curated by James Moffatt, Anagnorisis Fine Arts, NYC (USA)

2009

- WORLD, School of Visual Arts, NYC (USA)
- XOXO, Anagnorisis Fine Arts, NYC (USA)

2008

- BY INA, School of Visual Arts, NYC (USA)

=== Group exhibitions ===
2013

- THE YOUTH CODE!, Christophe Guye Galerie, Zurich (Switzerland)

2012

- ICONS OF TOMORROW, Christophe Guye Galerie, Zurich (Switzerland)
- FLASH FORWARD 2011, Magenta Foundation, Portland (Canada)
- PHOTO ASSIGNMENT EXHIBITION, Festival International de Mode et de Photographie, Hyeres (France)
- GIRLCORE, Orange Dot Gallery, London (UK)

2011

- FLASH FORWARD 2011, Magenta Foundation, Portland (Canada)
- FOAM TALENT 2011 Foam Fotografiemuseum Amsterdam, International Photography Magazine, Amsterdam (The Netherlands)
- TOKYO PHOTO 2011, Danziger Gallery, Tokyo Midtown Hall, Tokyo (Japan)
- GROUP EXHIBITION, Festival International de Mode et de Photographie, Hyeres (France)
- New Visual Artists 2011, Print Magazine, NYC (USA)

2010

- KiptonART RISING g 2011, KiptonART, NYC (USA)
- FUTURE PERFECT, Curated by Stephen Frailey, KiptonART, NYC (USA)
- MENTORS AT NEW YORK PHOTO FESTIVAL, NYPH’10, NYC (USA)
- ANOTHER ART SHOW, Submergedart Gallery, Newark (USA)
- MENTORS, Visual Arts Gallery, NYC (USA)
- GROUP SHOW 34, Humble
- iGavel Emering Artist Auction, Daniel Cooney Fine Art, Online

2009

- BASICALLY HUMAN, Curated by Stephen Frailey, The Empty Quarter, Dubai (UAE); Visual Arts Gallery, NYC (USA)
- SURFACE LIFE, Visual Arts Gallery, NYC (USA)

2008

- OUR LADY _ist Gallery, NYC (USA)

== Awards ==
2013

- Foam Paul Huf Award from Foam Fotografiemuseum Amsterdam, Nominee

2012

- Foam Paul Huf Award from Foam Fotografiemuseum Amsterdam, Nominee

2011

- PDN 30, Nominee
- Foam Talent 2011
- Flash Forward 2011, Winner
- Festival d’Hyeres 2011, Finalist
- 20 Under 30 New Visual Artists
- Foam Paul Huf Award, Nominee

2010

- PDN 30, Nominee
- KiptonART Rising 2011, Winner
- Creativity 40th Annual Print, Platinum
- Creativity International Awards
- The Tierney Fellowship, Nominee
