= Luba Lukova =

American visual artist

- Born: Plovdiv, Bulgaria
- Known for: Poster art, graphic design
- Awards: Grand Prix Savignac; Gold Pencil, The One Club; Reisman Foundation Award
- Website: lukova.net

Luba Lukova is an American visual artist based in New York. Her work has been exhibited internationally and is included in the permanent collections of Museum of Modern Art, New York; Denver Art Museum; Bibliothèque nationale de France, Paris; Hong Kong Heritage Museum; Centre de la Gravure et de l'Image imprimée, La Louvière, Belgium; Center for Contemporary Graphic Art, Sukagawa, Japan; The Ford Foundation, New York; The Thermos Foundation, Taipei, Taiwan; and World Bank, Washington, D.C.

== Early life and career ==
Lukova was born in Plovdiv, Bulgaria. She moved to the United States in 1991 following an invitation to participate in the Colorado International Invitational Poster Exhibition. On her way back, she visited New York and soon after began working for the New York Times, publishing her drawings in the paper's Book Review and Opinion sections.

== Work ==
Lukova's art uses visual metaphors and minimal text. She often addresses social issues including war, peace, income inequality, censorship, and corruption. These themes appear in her Designing Justice series and in commissioned work for humanitarian organizations, theater productions, universities, and publishers.

== Awards and recognition ==
Lukova's awards include the Grand Prix Savignac at the International Poster Salon in Paris; the Gold Pencil from The One Club in New York; Honor Laureate at the International Poster Exhibition in Fort Collins, Colorado; and the Reisman Foundation Award. She holds an honorary doctoral degree from The Art Institute of Boston.

== Selected solo exhibitions ==
- The Printed Woman, an Installation with Prints by Luba Lukova, La Galleria at LaMaMa, New York, 2001
- Umbrellas, Social Justice & More: Two Exhibitions by Luba Lukova, The Art Institute of Boston, Massachusetts, 2008
- Umbrellas, Social Justice & More, La Galleria at LaMaMa, New York, 2009
- Social Justice and Other Works, Fairbanks Gallery, Portland, Oregon, 2009
- I Have a Dream, UAB Visual Arts Gallery, Birmingham, Alabama, 2012
- Graphic Guts, Gold Coast Arts Center, Great Neck, New York, 2015
- Graphic Guts: The Art of Luba Lukova, Glassel Gallery, Baton Rouge, Louisiana, 2015
- Luba Lukova: Designing Justice, Museum of Design Atlanta, Georgia, 2017
- Luba Lukova: Designing Justice, Jewish Museum Milwaukee, Wisconsin, 2020–2021
- Luba Lukova: Designing Justice, National Underground Railroad Freedom Center, A Smithsonian Affiliate in Cincinnati, Ohio, 2021–2022
