= Rosemarie Allen =

American academic

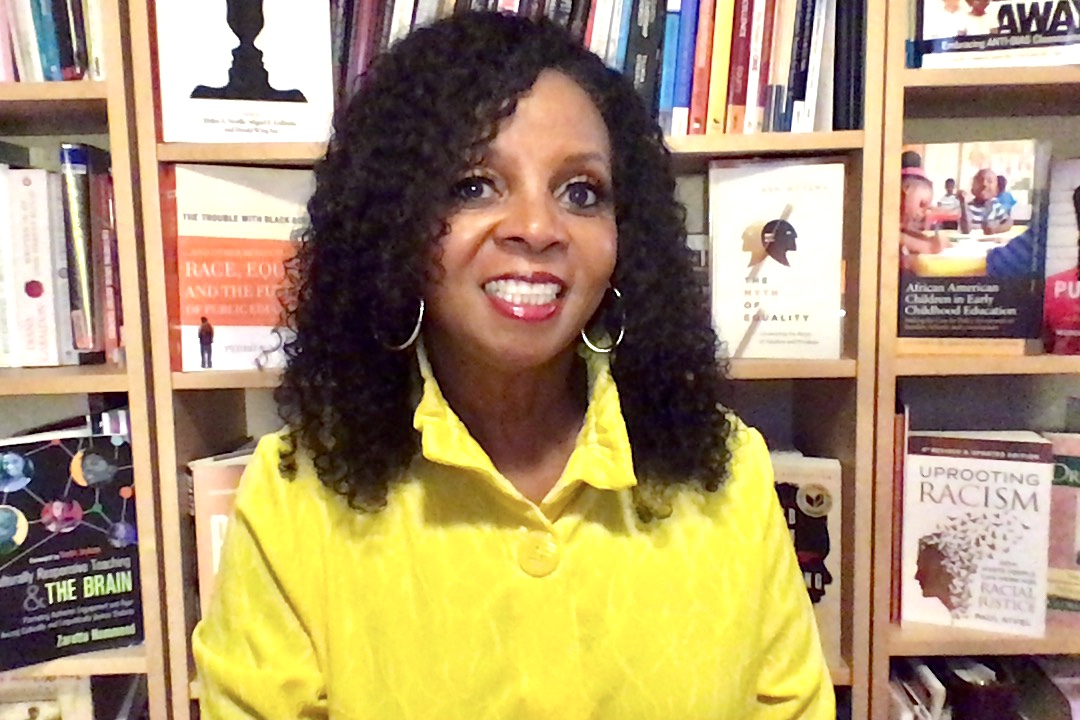
- Born: South Los Angeles, California, US

Academic background
- Education: California State University, Long Beach (BA); Lesley University (MEd); University of Colorado Denver (EdD)

Academic work
- Discipline: Early childhood development, diversity, equity, inclusion
- Institutions: Metropolitan State University of Denver
- Website: www.rosemarieallen.com

Rosemarie Allen is an American academic who specializes in diversity, equity, and inclusion. She is an associate professor of early childhood development at the Metropolitan State University of Denver and president and chief executive officer for the Institute for Racial Equity and Excellence.

== Early life and education ==
Allen was raised in South-Central Los Angeles, California. She completed her B.A. from California State University, Long Beach. Allen earned a Master of Education from Lesley University and a Doctor of Education in Equity and Leadership in Education at the University of Colorado Denver.

== Career ==
Allen's works specialize in early childhood development, diversity, equity, and inclusion. She has authored three children's books on diversity. Allen served in directorship roles with the Colorado Department of Human Services as the director of the division of early learning and in youth corrections. Allen joined the faculty at Metropolitan State University of Denver in 2004 and is an associate professor of early childhood education. She is the president and CEO for the Institute for Racial Equity and Excellence, a nonprofit organization which licenses child care providers in three counties in Colorado.

== Selected works ==
- Allen, Rosemarie (2018). Cute and Curly. Center for Equity & Excellence. ISBN 978-1-7323442-2-8.
- Allen, Rosemarie (2018). Stylish and Straight. Center for Equity & Excellence. ISBN 978-1-7323442-1-1.
