= Martin Klimas =

German photographer

Martin Klimas (born 1971) is a German photographer.

== Biography ==
Klimas obtained his degree in Visual Communications from Fachhochschule Dusseldorf. He has had a number of exhibitions in Germany and abroad. Kilmas has a new series called ‘Exploding Vegetables,' which is created by "firing a projectile into different kinds of fruits and vegetables reflecting our shift towards healthy food and away from junk food."

== Represented by ==
- Galerie Cosar
- Foley Gallery in New York City
