= Sherri Littlefield =

American artist and art curator

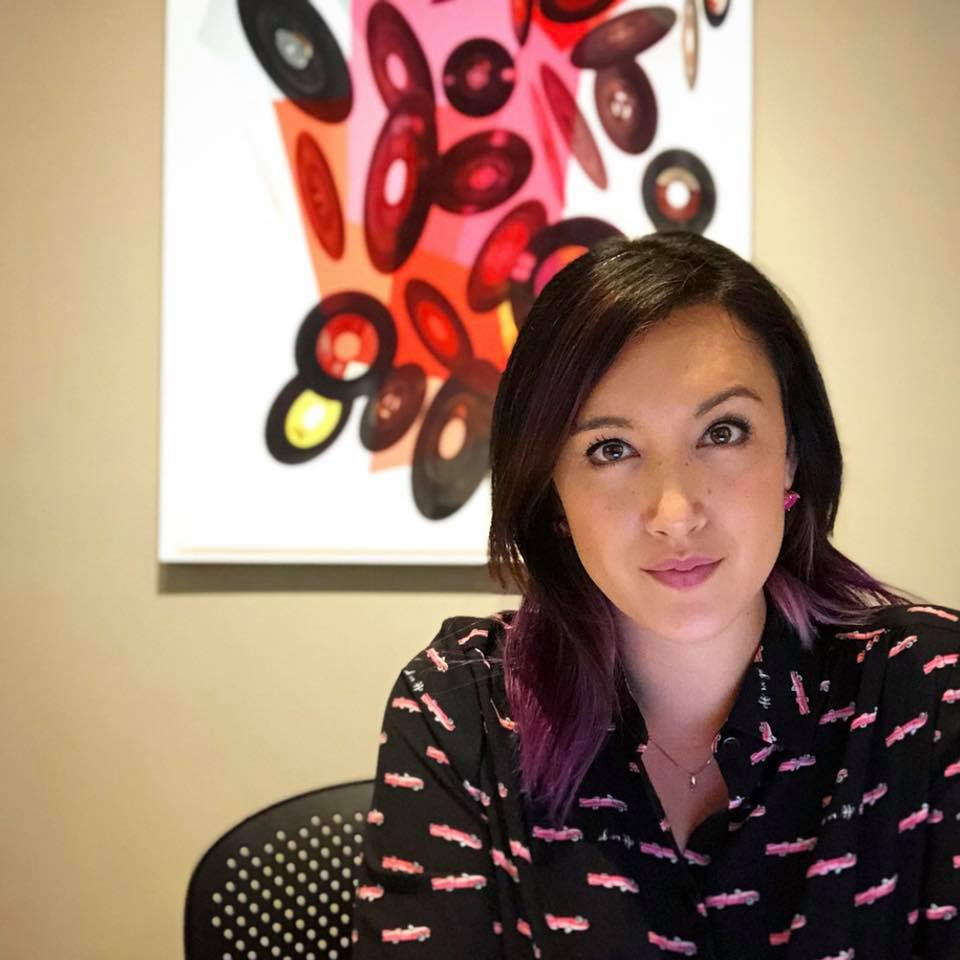
- Born: Sherri Nienass
- Education: Florida State University University of Central Florida
- Occupations: Curator, Art Dealer
- Spouse: Andrew Littlefield (m. 2014; div. 2026)
- Relatives: William Nienass (brother)

Sherri Nienass (born January 24, 1987) also known as Sherri Nienass Littlefield, is an American artist, photographer, curator and art dealer. She is most known for her elaborate curatorial projects, and as the former director of Foley Gallery on the Lower East Side of Manhattan.

In 2016, Nienass founded treat gallery, a collaborative project that helps nonprofits and underrepresented artists through contemporary art.

== Personal life ==
Sherri was born in Milwaukee, Wisconsin, raised in Central Florida and graduated from Eau Gallie High School in 2005. Nienass identifies as Christian, is a practicing Lutheran, and attends Lutheran Church Missouri Synod church Our Saviour New York. Littlefield is a fan of WWE, and attended WrestleMania 36.

In 2014, she married former music therapist turned editor and writer Andrew Littlefield in Atlanta, Georgia. As of 2018, they resided in the Crown Heights neighborhood of Brooklyn, New York. The couple divorced in 2026.

== Education ==
Nienass graduated with a BS in studio art in 2009 from Florida State University in Tallahassee, Florida, where she was a member of Marching Chiefs and classmates with multi-media and installation artist Rachel Rossin. She received her master's degree in fine arts in emerging media from the University of Central Florida in 2012. American interdisciplinary artist Wanda Raimundi-Ortiz served on her graduate thesis committee. Nienass was honored as a 30 under 30 recipient in 2016 for "recognition as an outstanding young alumni who strives for greatness in her professional and personal life."

After a summer internship at Tandem Press, in Madison, Wisconsin, Nienass completed graduate school at UCF.

== Career ==
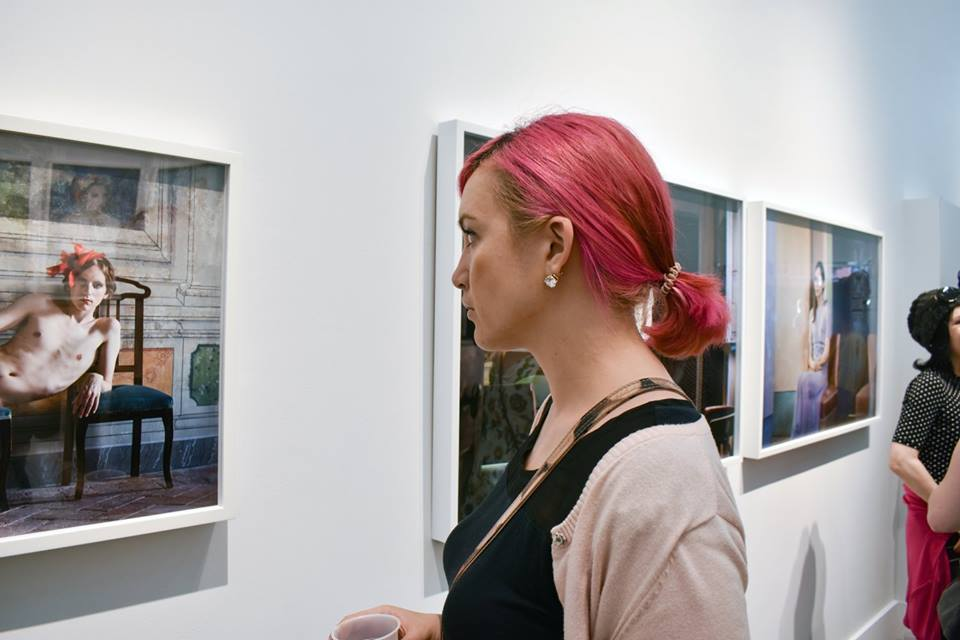
Littlefield viewing a photograph by Lissa Rivera at ClampArt.

Nienass moved to Atlanta, Georgia, and began working at the Savannah College of Art and Design. She moved to New York City in 2015. From 2015 to 2018, Sherri worked at Parsons School of Design.

In 2016, Nienass launched treat gallery, a project that donates a portion of sales to local non-profits and charities. In a 2016 interview, Nienass cited Patrick and Holly Kahn, founders of Snap! Orlando, and Matthew Deleget, artist and founder of Minus Space as inspirations due to their ability to "put their families first but have a deep love for their community and career."

Since 2018, Nienass has served on the board for the NY chapter of the American Society of Media Photographers. As of 2020, she is the Fine Art Chair. Nienass aims to use her skills toward positive causes.

Nienass was a judge for the 2019 Photo District News The Curator Photo Contest, alongside Flowers Gallery director Brent Beamon, Bruce Silverstein director Frances Jakubek and Jackson Fine Art director Coco Conroy.

Nienass has described her own art as "empathetic, comical and sympathetic" and "a celebration and commentary on the beauty industry and contemporary consumerism."

In 2019, Nienass began a documentary project, using Snapchat Spectacles titled Calling Men, which depicted men catcalling her on the streets. Through the use of special glasses (developed by Snapchat), Littlefield is able to subtly photograph her cat-callers with her sunglasses in a less confrontational/direct way than a typical camera allows. The images she captures speak both to the frequency and severity of this universally shared female experience.

During the COVID-19 Pandemic, Nienass was the Interim Director of ClampArt. As of 2026, Nienass is a Social Media professor at the Fashion Institute of Technology in New York City, and a Coordinator specializing in Art and Design for Nordstrom New York City.

== Exhibitions ==
Nienass creates and exhibits personal art while simultaneously curating art fairs and exhibitions. Most notably, she was among the youngest curators at the 2019 edition of The Photography Show, an established and competitive Photography Fair presented by AIPAD (an acronym for the Association of International Photography Art Dealers.) During PULSE Art Fair's 15th anniversary, Nienass presented a colorful, large scale exhibition featuring work by over 60 artists, with proceeds benefitting the onePULSE Foundation, a non-profit linked to building a memorial regarding the PULSE nightclub shootings in Orlando, Florida.

- 2020 Center For Book Arts, New York, NY
- 2019 PULSE Art Fair, Miami Beach, FL
- Satellite Art Show, New York, NY
- The Photography Show presented by AIPAD, New York, NY
- Foley Gallery, New York, NY
- Satellite Art Show at SXSW, Austin, TX
- 2018 Aqua Art Miami, Miami Beach, FL
- 2016 Court Tree Collective, Brooklyn, NY
