= Museum of Sex =

Museum in Manhattan, New York

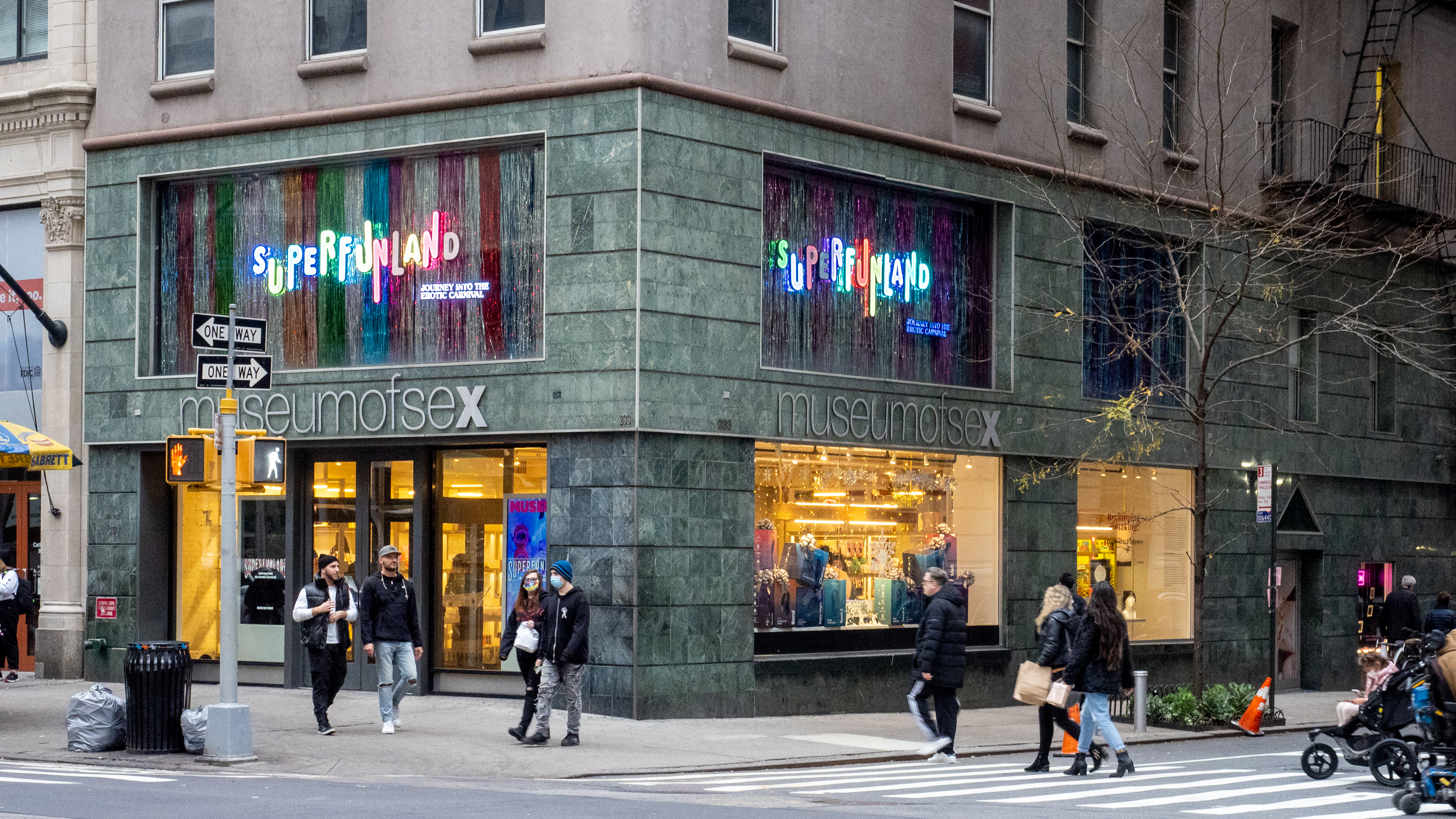
- Established: October 5, 2002
- Location: 233 Fifth Avenue, Manhattan, New York City, New York, United States
- Coordinates: 40°44′39″N 73°59′15″W
- Public transit access: Bus: M1, M2, M3, M5, M23; Subway: at 23rd Street or 28th Street
- Website: museumofsex.com

The Museum of Sex, also known as MoSex, is a sex museum dedicated to preserving and presenting the history, evolution, and cultural significance of human sexuality. The museum focuses on a variety of sexual preferences and subcultures, including lesbian and gay history and erotica, BDSM, pornography, and sex work. Due to explicit content in its educational exhibits, visitors must be at least 18 years old. Despite initial controversy from religious groups and rejection for non-profit status by the New York State Board of Regents, the museum has operated without significant opposition since opening and has hosted interfaith events exploring sexuality and religion.

Located at 233 Fifth Avenue at the corner of East 27th Street in Manhattan, New York City, the museum opened on October 5, 2002, founded by Daniel Gluck. In 2024, the museum expanded with a second location in Miami, Florida.

== Mission and purpose ==
The official mission of the Museum of Sex is "to preserve and present the history, evolution, and cultural significance of human sexuality. In its exhibitions, programs and publications, The Museum of Sex is committed to open discourse and exchange, and to bringing to the public the best in current scholarship." Although the museum's exhibits are presented in an educational format, they sometimes feature explicit content. Due to this, visitors must be at least 18 years old.

== History ==
The Museum of Sex was founded in 2002 by Daniel Gluck, an entrepreneur and cultural preservation advocate. Gluck is the son of a Belgian Jewish refugee and an Iraqi-born Israeli who later settled in New York. Gluck wanted to start a museum dedicated to "the history, evolution and cultural significance of human sexuality." While Gluck was planning the museum, the New York State Board of Regents rejected its application for non-profit status, objecting that the idea of a "museum of sex" made "a mockery" of the concept of museums. Because of this, and because Gluck opted not to accept funding from the pornography industry, the admission fee was initially $17. The museum has since faced legal backlash for $4 "junk fees".

Before the Museum opened to the public, William Donohue of the Catholic League for Religious and Civil Rights called it a "museum of smut", writing, "If the museum's officials were honest, they would include a death chamber that would acknowledge all the wretched diseases that promiscuity has caused. And they would give due recognition to the role that promiscuity has played in creating poverty. But instead we can look for the museum to celebrate public sex." However, since it opened in 2002, the Museum has faced no opposition from religious officials and even hosted an event entitled "Faith in Latex" which brought together leaders from the Catholic, Pentecostal, Episcopalian, Buddhist, and Jewish faiths.

== Exhibitions ==
The inaugural exhibit, NYC Sex: How New York City Transformed Sex in America, focused on the museum's home city, but later exhibits focused on sexuality in other cultures and time periods. Other exhibitions have included Sex Among the Lotus: 2500 Years of Chinese Erotic Obsession; GET OFF: Exploring the Pleasure Principles; Vamps & Virgins: The Evolution of American Pinup Photography 1860–1960; Men Without Suits: Objectifying the American Male Body; and an online exhibition US Patent Office Sex Inventions.

Under Associate Curator Lissa Rivera, the museum expanded its focus to include contemporary art and historically marginalized voices. Rivera curated Leonor Fini: Theatre of Desire, the first U.S. museum survey of the Surrealist artist and Canon: Juan José Barboza-Gubo & Andrew Mroczek, the museum's first bilingual exhibition.

== Locations and facilities ==
Unlike restrictions placed on adult entertainment venues, New York City authorities have allowed the museum to locate itself within 500 feet (150 m) of a church or school. In 2009, the Museum began an expansion project moving its entrance from 27th Street to Fifth Avenue. The Museum also doubled the square footage of its store and increased the size of the museum by one floor, as well as adding another gallery. They further expanded by adding an aphrodisiac-themed cafe and additional gallery space.

In October 2024, the Museum opened a second location in Miami, Florida. The new venue is a converted warehouse designed by the Norwegian architectural firm of Snøhetta.

== Bibliography ==
- Blumenthal, Ralph (September 19, 2002). "Sex Museum Says It Is Here to Educate". The New York Times.
- Chancellor, Alexander (September 27, 2002). "The Opposite of Sex". The Guardian.
- Steinberg, David (October 18, 2002). "New York's Thoughtful Museum of Sex". The Spectator. Archived from the original on March 10, 2016.
