= St. James Davis chimpanzee attack =

2005 chimpanzee attack in California, US

NASCAR Winston West Series driver St. James and his wife, LaDonna, had a pet chimpanzee named Moe, whom they treated as if he were a child. After Moe bit several people, the city of West Covina, California, seized and placed him in an animal sanctuary near Bakersfield, California. St. James and LaDonna waged a long, unsuccessful legal battle to recover him.

On March 3, 2005, while at the sanctuary on one of their frequent visits with Moe, St. James and LaDonna were attacked by two young male chimpanzees which had escaped their enclosures. In the ensuing attack, LaDonna lost her thumb, and St. James was severely mauled, resulting in permanent disfigurement and missing extremities.

== Background ==
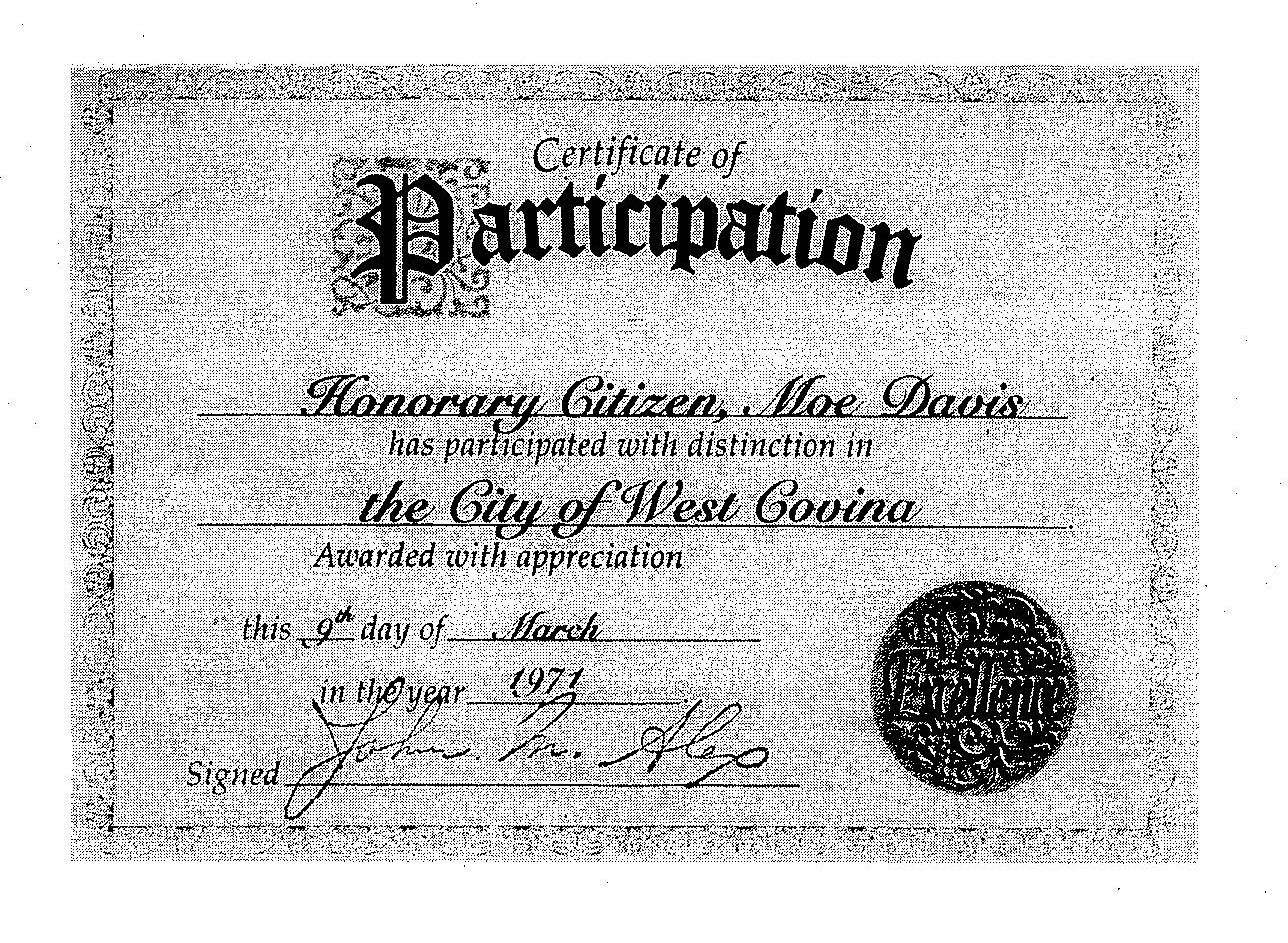
West Covina "Honorary Citizen" certificate for Moe issued in 1971

St. James and LaDonna Davis adopted a chimpanzee named Moe in 1967, not long after his birth in Tanzania. Tanzanian poachers had killed his mother when he was one day old. St. James and LaDonna were unable to have children due to LaDonna suffering from uterine cancer and requiring a hysterectomy, so they raised him as their own. He lived with them in their home, wore clothes, was toilet trained, and took showers. He participated in their wedding; LaDonna said he acted as “a combination of flower-thrower and best man".

In 1977, when Moe was 10 years old, he bit a woman, injuring her finger. A lawsuit followed, but the case was dismissed. In the 1990s, Moe was housed in a 10 ft (3.0 m) by 12 ft (3.7 m) enclosure at St. James and LaDonna's home. On August 16, 1998, he escaped. They claimed that he had been frightened by an electric shock that occurred while his cage was being repaired. Local police were called, and several officers were required to restrain him. While resisting recapture, he dented a police car and mauled a police officer's hand. The police officer required medical treatment and subsequent rehabilitation costing US$250,000 (equivalent to $516,000) in 2025 adjusted for inflation.

On September 2, 1999, a visitor came to see Moe. St. James and LaDonna said that they warned her not to attempt to approach his cage, but she extended her hand into it, and he bit her. St. James and LaDonna claimed that she wore red nail polish, and Moe had mistaken her nails for his favorite licorice. She sued, and St. James and LaDonna settled the lawsuit.

West Covina officials seized Moe and relocated him to Wildlife WayStation, an animal sanctuary. St. James and LaDonna fought to regain custody of him, but were unsuccessful. In 2002, they filed a civil rights lawsuit against West Covina; after a long legal dispute, the judge sided with the couple and ordered the city to pay them US$100,000 (equivalent to US$185,632.02 in 2026) plus US$225,000 (equivalent to US$412,632 in 2026) for a home purchase in nearby Baldwin Park, California, where they could live with Moe.

== Attack ==
St. James and LaDonna visited Moe regularly at the animal sanctuary. In 2003, the sanctuary experienced licensing problems, so he was transferred to Animal Haven Ranch, a 22-acre (8.9 ha) nonprofit sanctuary near Bakersfield, California that housed six primates.

On March 3, 2005, St. James and LaDonna came to Animal Haven Ranch to celebrate Moe's 39th birthday. They brought him a birthday cake and were seated at a picnic table next to his enclosure. They brought toys, candy hearts, chocolate milk, and a raspberry-filled sheet cake for the party. LaDonna said Moe clapped his hands with joy when he saw them. She cut a piece of cake for him and then, when she went to cut a second piece, she noticed that another chimpanzee had gotten out of its cage due to the sanctuary’s staff forgetting to lock the cage. It rushed up to her and bit her thumb off. St. James pushed her under the table to protect her. A second chimpanzee was also loose. The two young chimpanzees involved in the attack were named Buddy and Ollie, who were former actors. Their motive for the attack was likely out of jealousy for Moe getting attention. Buddy was the older of the two at 16; Ollie was 13. Two female chimpanzees named Susie and Bones also escaped from their cages during the attack, but did not participate in it and fled the scene. They were recaptured by wildlife officers five hours later. Moe also did not participate in the attack and did not attempt to defend St. James.

Buddy and Ollie attacked St. James simultaneously; one chimpanzee initially attacked his face, while the other attacked his foot. The sanctuary owner's son-in-law, Mark Carruthers, retrieved a .45 caliber revolver and fatally shot Buddy in the head. Meanwhile, Ollie dragged St. James' wounded body down a walkway. Carruthers followed and also shot Ollie dead.

Buddy and Ollie destroyed a majority of St. James' fingers, his left foot, most of his buttocks, both testicles, part of his torso, and parts of his face including his nose and lips. A horrified paramedic Curt Merrell who arrived on scene described the injuries as, "It looked like a grizzly bear attack." St. James was transported to Loma Linda University Medical Center after the attack.

== Aftermath ==
Davis spent six months in the hospital recovering from the attack, including a period of time when he was in a coma. Between 2005 and 2009, he underwent over 60 surgeries. He had a prosthetic eye and two slits in the middle of his face where his nose had been. He and LaDonna were uninsured, but initially decided not to sue Animal Haven, before reversing course and filing a lawsuit by 2009.

In 2006, the year following the attack, St. James and LaDonna placed a sign in their front yard that read "Free Moe". They also went to Superior Court in Pomona, California, to get the city of West Covina to honor their 2002 settlement which required it to purchase a home for them in Baldwin Park so that they could reunite with Moe. In 2007, the court ruled that West Covina should pay them US$32,000 in damages (i.e., about US$49,700 in 2025 dollars) because the city failed to fulfill their obligations under the 2002 settlement and pay them $300 per month towards covering the costs of Moe's housing, and covering travel expenses for their visits to him.

Moe disappeared in the summer of 2008. He had been living at "Jungle Exotics", a ranch for performing animals in San Bernardino, and escaped. Construction workers reported they had seen him at a home near Jungle Exotics; other witnesses spotted him heading towards a mountain. St. James and LaDonna hired a helicopter to do flyovers in an attempt to flush him out of hiding; authorities thoroughly searched the San Bernardino National Forest, but he has never been found, remains missing to this day (as of 2026), and stands a good chance of having perished due to never learning the skills necessary for surviving in the wild, given his having spent his life as an indoor pet companion.

St. James suffered a stroke in December 2017 and died of a cardiopulmonary arrest in July of the next year at the age of 74 years old. LaDonna later became a victim of elder abuse through financial means. The alleged perpetrator, Min Zaw Maw, coerced her into signing over a living will to himself that included the Davis's properties and control of active bank accounts. By the time authorities stepped in, the house had been taken over by members of the Mongols Motorcycle Club who had forced Min Zaw Maw out and were neglecting LaDonna's care. After the motorcycle gang were evicted, a legal battle began with Min Zaw Maw, which was eventually settled to preserve what remained of LaDonna's stolen assets, rather than risk a lengthy and expensive court case.

== See also ==
- List of individual apes
- Travis (chimpanzee)
