= Captive Primate Safety Act =

Proposed US Federal legislation

- Long title: An Act to amend the Lacey Act Amendments of 1981 to prohibit interstate or foreign commerce in certain nonhuman primates.

Citations
- Statutes at Large: S. 1594; H.R. 3199

Codification
- Acts amended: Lacey Act Amendments of 1981
- Titles amended: 18 U.S.C. § 42

The Captive Primate Safety Act is proposed United States legislation that would modify the Lacey Act Amendments of 1981 to treat nonhuman primates as prohibited wildlife species, allowing exemptions for zoos and research facilities. The bill would eliminate the use of primates in the domestic pet trade at a federal level. A December 2023 review found that the "U.S. ranked third out of 171 countries in the ease of purchasing a pet primate online, behind Indonesia and Vietnam." The bill, if passed, would raise U.S. standards to resemble those of the European Union, United Kingdom, Italy, the Netherlands, and other countries where pet primates are strictly regulated.

The Captive Primate Safety Act was first introduced in 2005, and some version of the legislation has passed the Senate once and the House twice. However, the bill has never passed both houses of Congress in the same session. As of November 2025, the 119th Congress had bills in the Senate (S.1594) and the House (H.R.3199).

In April 2024, the Captive Primate Safety Act was introduced in Congress by U.S. Senator Richard Blumenthal (D-CT), U.S. Representative Earl Blumenauer (D-OR), and U.S. Congressman Brian Fitzpatrick (R-PA). In September 2024, Blumenthal held a press conference with Friends of Animals to promote the Act in the wake of the HBO series Chimp Crazy, which highlights disturbing examples of primate "pets".

The proposed legislation has been endorsed by a variety of animal welfare organizations, including the Animal Welfare Institute, Friends of Animals, Born Free USA, the Humane Society of the United States, the Animal Legal Defense Fund, the International Fund for Animal Welfare, Four Paws USA, the Global Federation of Animal Sanctuaries, the Association of Zoos and Aquariums, and the American Society of Primatologists. The law also has support from law enforcement agencies, including the Small and Rural Law Enforcement Executives Association and National Sheriffs' Association.

== History ==
The Captive Primate Safety Act was first introduced in the United States House of Representatives by Rep. Eddie Johnson on March 16, 2005. The bill was reintroduced by Rep. Mark Kirk in February 2009 following the widely publicized mauling of Charla Nash by Travis, a pet chimpanzee. Rep. Rob Bishop argued against the bill during the floor debate, noting it would cost $4 million annually and do nothing directly to prevent chimpanzee attacks on humans; he also noted such attacks are relatively rare. As of 2009, twenty states and the District of Columbia already had laws banning primates as pets.

Congress	Short title	Bill number(s)	Date introduced	Sponsor(s)	# of cosponsors	Latest status
109th Congress	Captive Primate Safety Act	H.R. 1329	March 16, 2005	Eddie Bernice Johnson (D-TX)	47	Died in committee
109th Congress	Captive Primate Safety Act of 2005	S. 1509	July 27, 2005	Jim Jeffords (I-VT)	6	Passed Senate (unanimous consent)
110th Congress	Captive Primate Safety Act	H.R. 2964	July 10, 2007	Eddie Bernice Johnson (D-TX)	25	Passed House (302-96)
110th Congress	Captive Primate Safety Act	S. 1498	May 24, 2007	Barbara Boxer (D-CA)	5	Died in committee
111th Congress	Captive Primate Safety Act	H.R. 80	January 6, 2009	Earl Blumenauer (D-OR)	27	Passed House (323-95)
111th Congress	Captive Primate Safety Act	S. 462	February 24, 2009	Barbara Boxer (D-CA)	8	Died in committee
112th Congress	Captive Primate Safety Act	H.R. 4306	March 29, 2012	Mike Fitzpatrick (R-PA)	9	Died in committee
112th Congress	Captive Primate Safety Act	S. 1324	July 5, 2011	Barbara Boxer (D-CA)	6	Died in committee
113th Congress	Captive Primate Safety Act	H.R. 2856	July 30, 2013	Mike Fitzpatrick (R-PA)	152	Died in committee
113th Congress	Captive Primate Safety Act	S. 1463	August 1, 2013	Barbara Boxer (D-CA)	25	Died in committee
114th Congress	Captive Primate Safety Act	H.R. 2920	June 25, 2015	Mike Fitzpatrick (R-PA)	75	Died in committee
116th Congress	Captive Primate Safety Act	H.R. 1776	March 14, 2019	Earl Blumenauer (D-OR)	66	Died in committee
116th Congress	Captive Primate Safety Act	S. 2562	September 26, 2019	Richard Blumenthal (D-CT)	12	Died in committee
117th Congress	Captive Primate Safety Act	H.R. 3135	May 12, 2021	Earl Blumenauer (D-OR)	67	Referred to committee
117th Congress	Captive Primate Safety Act	S. 1588	May 12, 2021	Richard Blumenthal (D-CT)	11	Referred to committee
118th Congress	Captive Primate Safety Act	H.R. 8164	April 30, 2024	Earl Blumenauer (D-OR-3)	42	Referred to committee
118th Congress	Captive Primate Safety Act	S.4206	April 30, 2024	Richard Blumenthal (D-CT)	6	Referred to committee
119th Congress	Captive Primate Safety Act	H.R. 3199	May 5, 2025	Mike Quigley (D-IL-5)	39	Referred to committee
119th Congress	Captive Primate Safety Act	S.1594	May 5, 2025	Richard Blumenthal (D-CT)	11	Referred to committee
