= Margaret McKenna (academic) =

American attorney and educator (born 1945)

Margaret McKenna is a civil rights attorney, academic, educator, public speaker and expert on philanthropy. She has served on the boards of several universities and businesses in the US.

== Career ==
McKenna was born in 1945. She received her B.A. from Emmanuel College in Boston, Massachusetts, and her J.D. from Southern Methodist University in Dallas, Texas.

She started her career as a civil rights lawyer in the United States Department of Justice. She then served as Deputy Under Secretary of Education and Deputy White House Counsel, under President Jimmy Carter. She left the White House to work as the Executive Director of IAOHRA, the national association for city and state Human Rights Commissions. McKenna went on to teach at Brandeis University and serve as director of the Bunting Institute (now Radcliffe Institute) at Harvard University.

In 1985 she moved to Lesley University. She was president of the university for 22 years.

After Lesley University, McKenna moved to Wal-Mart and was president of the Walmart Foundation from 2007 to 2011. During her time there, she led a $2 billion hunger campaign, a women's economic initiative and several initiatives to close the Education Opportunity Gap.

McKenna was appointed president of Suffolk University in Boston, Massachusetts in July 2015. On February 5, 2016, she announced her resignation from her post, following a deadlock with the university's board of trustees over their bid to remove her from office. She stepped down before the start of Suffolk's 2017-2018 academic year. At the same time, Board of Trustees Chairman Andrew Meyer Jr., announced his plans not to seek re-election after his term expired in May 2016.

== Awards ==
McKenna has received several awards from organizations including the Boston Chamber of Commerce, Council of Independent Colleges, Meals on Wheels, Feeding America and Women's Equity Action League. She has also received nine Honorary Degrees.

== Current service ==
In 2023, McKenna serves on the boards of the Boston Human Rights Commission, Boston After School and Beyond, Team Harmony Institute and Beth Israel Leahy Health. She has also been appointed as Chancellor of Lukenya University, Makueni County, Kenya.
