= Simon Schubert =

German artist

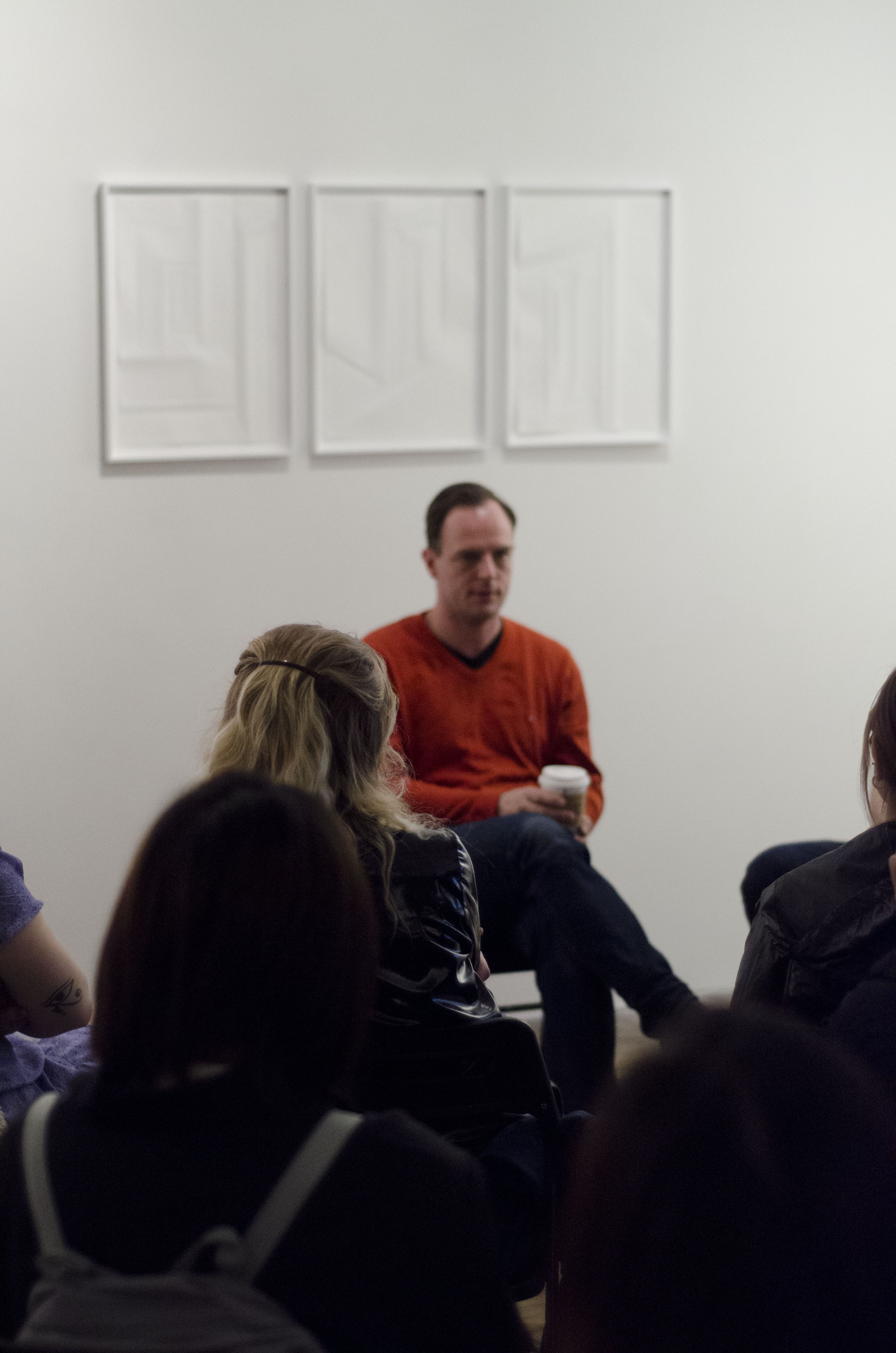

Simon Schubert (born 1976) is an artist based in Cologne, Germany, his birthplace. From 1997 to 2004 he trained at the Kunstakademie Düsseldorf in the sculpture class of Irmin Kamp.

Inspired by Surrealism as well as by Samuel Beckett, Schubert's works imagine architectural settings, common situations and objects, whereas the materials he uses are either simple or sophisticated - white paper folded or mixed media arrangements. Some of his paper foldings entered the West Collection, Oaks, PA, while the Saatchi Collection, London, owns sculptural works in mixed media.

In 2008, Schubert received the ZVAB Phönix Art Award for newcomers.

== Selected exhibitions ==
2018

Beyond the Doubt of a Shadow, Foley Gallery, New York City, NY

2008

monode, Kunst-Station St. Peter, Cologne

paper8, Upstairs Berlin

2007

Mythos, Upstairs Berlin – Zimmerstrasse, Berlin

Paramären, Kudlek van der Grinten Galerie, Cologne

Entropia, Villa de Bank, Enschede, NL

2006

Klasse Kamp, 1974-2006, Kunsthalle Düsseldorf

2005

Entwohner, Galerie van der Grinten, Cologne Kunstraum 22, Cologne

Stipendienausstellung des Vordemberge-Gildewart Stipendium, KölnKunst 7

2004

Bergischer Kunstpreis 2004, Museum Baden, Solingen

Airport Art, Frankfurt am Main

2001

Exhibition of the Kamp Class, Handwerkskammer Düsseldorf Alte Feuerwache, Cologne

1999

2012 Orc Genocide indie game
