= Lesley University =

Private university in Cambridge, Massachusetts, U.S.

Coordinates: 42°22′47.98″N 71°07′01.63″W

- Former names: Lesley School (1909–1944); Lesley College (1944–2001); School of Practical Art (1912–1967); Art Institute of Boston (1967–1998)
- Motto: Perissem Ni Perstitissem (Latin)
- Motto in English: I Would Have Perished Had I Not Persisted
- Type: Private university
- Established: 1909; 117 years ago
- Accreditation: NECHE
- Endowment: $184.2 million (2024)
- President: Joanne Kossuth (interim)
- Provost: Dr. Brian Becker
- Students: 2,557
- Undergraduates: 1,229
- Postgraduates: 1,328
- Location: Cambridge, Massachusetts, U.S.
- Campus: Urban, 15.87 acres (6.42 ha)
- Calendar: Semester
- Colors: Green and white
- Nickname: Lynx
- Sporting affiliations: NCAA Division III; New England Collegiate Conference
- Website: lesley.edu

- Location within Greater Boston area Location within Massachusetts Location within the United States

Lesley University is a private university in Cambridge, Massachusetts, United States. It was founded in 1909 to educate teachers. While founded as a women's college, male students were admitted beginning in 2005.

== History ==
=== Lesley School and College (1909–2001) ===
Presidents of Lesley University
| Edith Lesley | 1909–1938 |
| Gertrude Malloch | 1938–1943 |
| Marguerite Franklin | 1943 |
| Trentwell Mason White | 1944–1959 (died in office) |
| Sam Wonders | 1959–1960 (acting) |
| Don Orton | 1960–1985 |
| Margaret A. McKenna | 1985–2007 |
| Joseph B. Moore | 2007–2016 |
| Jeff A. Weiss | 2016–2018 |
| Richard S. Hansen | 2018–2019 (interim) |
| Janet L. Steinmayer | 2019–present |

The Lesley School (also known as Lesley Normal School) was founded by Edith Lesley in 1909 at her home at 29 Everett Street, Cambridge. The school began as a private women's institution that trained kindergarten teachers. It espoused the work of Friedrich Froebel, who invented the concept of kindergarten as a complement to the care given to children by their mothers. Teacher and writer Elizabeth Peabody opened Boston's first Froebel-inspired kindergarten in 1860; more kindergartens followed. Central to the Froebelian philosophy is the idea that individuals are important and unique, a focus that remains at Lesley University today.

Edith Lesley, after living in Panama and Maine and studying in Freiburg, Germany, moved to Boston and became involved in public school teaching. She completed kindergarten training, took courses at Radcliffe College, and then began to plan her own kindergarten training school. She wanted a school that would "consider the individual of basic importance; to inculcate the idea of gracious living; and to foster the tradition of American democracy." Once married, Lesley and her husband expanded the school by constructing an addition at the rear of their home, which today is known as Livingston Stebbins Hall. Around 1913, the Lesley School began training elementary teachers.

In 1941, the Lesley School reorganized under a board of trustees; in 1944, it received authority to award baccalaureate degrees and became known as Lesley College. In 1954, the college began to award graduate degrees; it later added majors in the fields of education, counseling, human services, global studies, art therapy, and management.

=== School of Practical Art and The Art Institute of Boston (1912–1998) ===
The School of Practical Art was founded by Roy Davidson in 1912. The school's early philosophy was based upon John Ruskin's words that it is "in art that the heart, the head, and the hand of a man come together" and Davidson's own belief that "beauty comes from the use." The school increasingly embraced the fine arts and developed a growing liberal arts curriculum; in 1967 the school was renamed The Art Institute of Boston (AIB) to acknowledge its increased focus upon fine art as well as design, illustration, and photography. In 1998, The Art Institute of Boston and Lesley College merged, setting the stage for the eventual formation of Lesley University, where AIB would become Lesley College of Art and Design.

=== Founding of Lesley University and early expansion (2001–2013) ===
Lesley became Lesley University in 2001. When university status was granted, the original colleges became the university's undergraduate units, while Lesley College's two graduate schools rounded out the university's four main academic units. In 2005, Lesley College (at that point, an all-female liberal arts college) became coeducational.

In 2006, the university acquired Prospect Hall, a former church listed on the National Register of Historic Places, with the goal of bringing The Art Institute of Boston to Cambridge. In 2007, Joseph B. Moore became president of Lesley. The following year, the university entered into a partnership with Episcopal Divinity School to jointly operate their Brattle Street campus and purchase several buildings. This move added dormitories, a dining hall, and classrooms, as well as expanded library services and administrative space.

In 2009, the university celebrated its centennial and embarked on its first major construction since the 1970s. Dormitories at 1 and 3 Wendell Street were added to the residential life offerings; both buildings are LEED Gold–certified.

=== Consolidation in Cambridge (2013–2018) ===
In 2013, construction on the Lunder Arts Center began in Porter Square. The project was built on the former site of the North Prospect Church, which was moved slightly to the south and repurposed. Also in 2013, Lesley University's constituent colleges, The Art Institute of Boston and Lesley College, were renamed College of Art and Design and College of Liberal Arts and Sciences, respectively; the change was reflective of the cohesion and growth of the two colleges.

In 2015, the College of Art and Design officially left Kenmore Square in Boston and joined the remainder of the university in Cambridge. This move marked the completion of the Lunder Arts Center and was the first time in 17 years that the university was entirely housed in Cambridge. The Lunder Arts Center was awarded a LEED Gold certification from the U.S. Green Building Council. Lesley also won a Preservation Award from the Cambridge Historical Commission for the restoration of the historic former North Prospect Church as part of the Lunder Arts Center project.

At the end of the 2014–15 academic year, President Joseph B. Moore announced that he would retire the following year. In 2016, Jeff A. Weiss became president; he resigned in 2018 due to personal health reasons and almost immediately became the Chief Strategy and Transformation Officer at Mass General Brigham. Richard S. Hansen became interim president later that year.

In July 2018, Lesley announced the purchase of the historic buildings formerly owned by the Episcopal Divinity School (EDS), making Lesley the sole owner of the 4.4-acre Brattle Campus. The purchase included five buildings – St. John's Memorial Chapel, Wright Hall, Burnham Hall, Reed Hall, and 4 Berkeley St. – and the remainder of Sherrill Hall. Since 2008, Lesley and EDS had jointly owned Sherrill Hall as part of the schools' condominium agreement.

=== Recent years (2019–present) ===
Janet L. Steinmayer became university president in July 2019. Since 2019, the faculty has passed three no-confidence votes against university leadership.

In 2021, Lesley briefly piloted a community-based partnership with DeMello International Center in New Bedford, Massachusetts.

In fall 2023, Lesley laid off 30 faculty members and 20 staff, largely from the undergraduate College of Liberal Arts and Sciences. The university also eliminated some ostensibly low-enrolled academic programs, including all social science majors, and announced an overall restructuring of the university, branded as "Better Lesley." As of 2024, enrollment had dropped to less than half its 2014 level.

== Academics ==
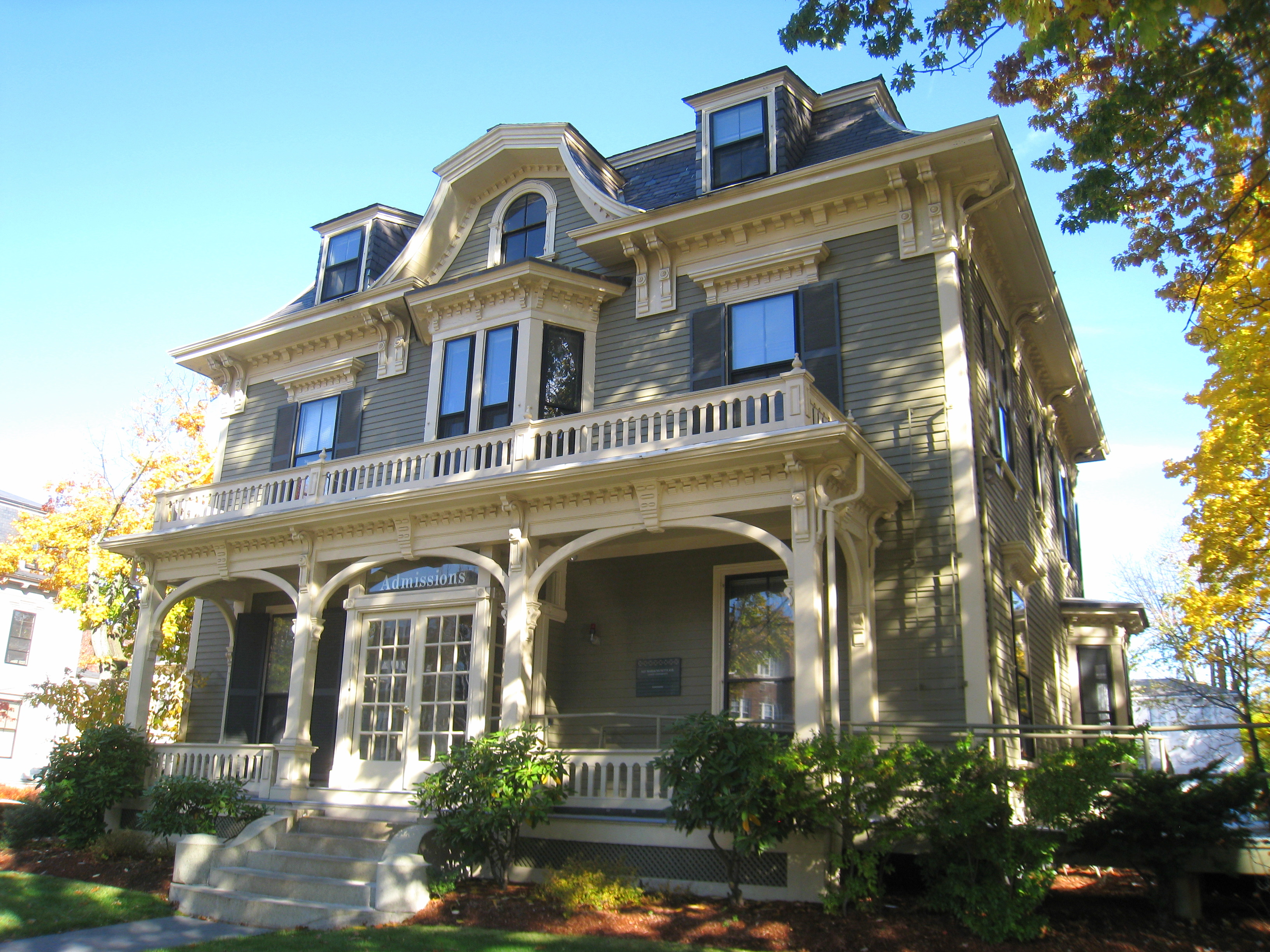
Undergraduate Admissions on the Doble Campus

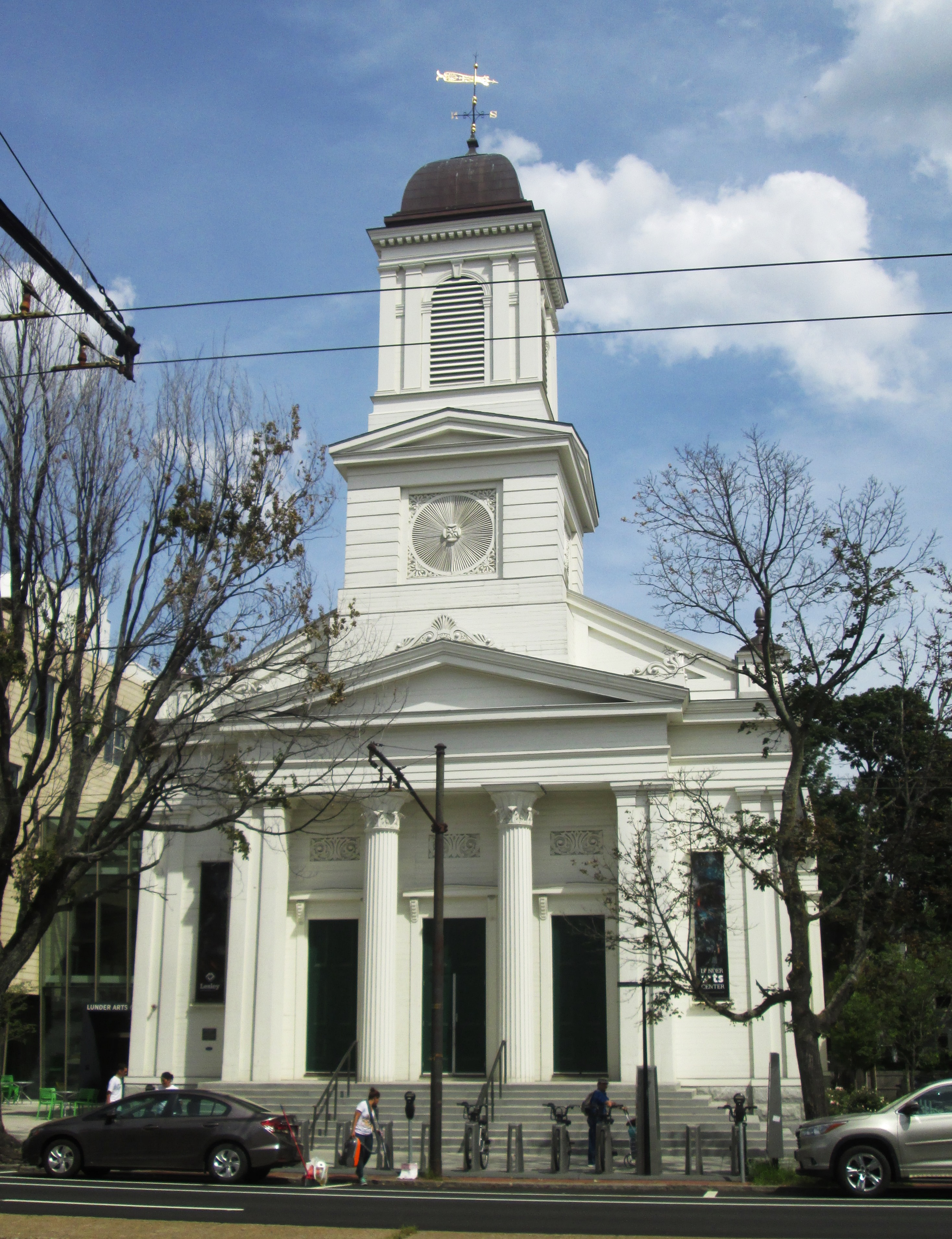
The historic landmark which was once the North Avenue Congregational Church and the North Prospect Congregational Church, is now Lesley University's John and Carol Moriarty Library, part of the Lunder Arts Center completed in January 2015

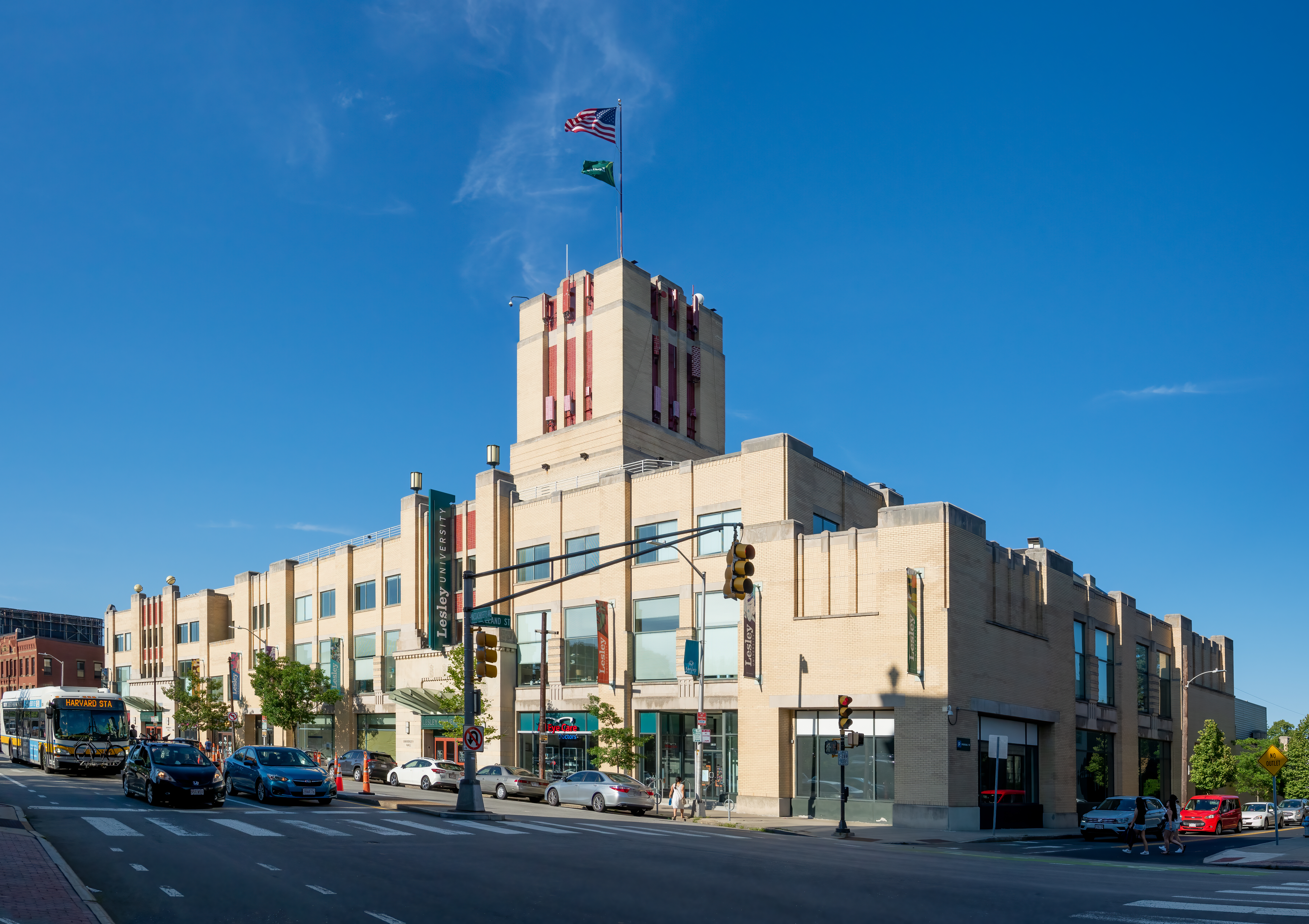
University Hall on the Porter Square campus

Lesley University is accredited by the New England Commission of Higher Education.The university, with its component undergraduate colleges, graduate schools, and centers, offers more than 20 undergraduate majors and over 90 Adult Bachelor's, Master's, Certificates of Advanced Graduate Study, and PhD programs at its Cambridge and Boston campuses, as well as off-campus and online. The Lesley Center for the Adult Learner offers an adult bachelor's degree program, including on- and off-campus courses as well as online and hybrid courses targeted toward adult learners.

The university is made up of the following academic units:

- College of Art and Design
- College of Liberal Arts and Sciences
  - Center for the Adult Learner
- Graduate School of Education
  - Center for Reading Recovery & Literacy Collaborative
- Graduate School of Arts and Social Sciences
- Threshold Program

The university library system is made up of the following units:

- Henry Knox Sherrill Library – Main collections
  - Teaching Resources Collection
  - Evelyn M. Finnegan '48 Collection for Children's Literature
- University Archives
- John and Carol Moriarty Library – Lunder Arts Center
  - Art and Design Collection

== Campuses ==
=== South Campus ===
The South Campus, formerly called the Brattle Campus, is on Brattle Street in the Old Cambridge Historic District, just west of Harvard Square. It is the former site of the Episcopal Divinity School. Lesley purchased the property completely in 2018, having previously shared it with Episcopal Divinity School. At some point between 2018–2020, it was renamed "South Campus".

It is home to four residence halls, a dining hall, classrooms, the Sherrill Hall, and the Graduate School of Arts and Social Sciences—that building is also the birthplace of Charles Sanders Peirce.

=== Doble Campus ===
The Doble Campus is between Harvard Square and Porter Square. It is named for Lesley benefactor and former chair of the Lesley Corporation, Frank C. Doble.

It is home to residence halls and a dining hall, classrooms, and the College of Liberal Arts and Sciences, as well as Marran Theater and a variety of administrative offices. It is also home to many student life facilities, such as the Margaret McKenna Student Center, the Information Commons (a 24-hour computer lab and study space), and the fitness center.

=== Porter Campus ===
The Porter Campus is in Porter Square.

It is home to the majority of the university's classroom space, the College of Art and Design, the Lunder Arts Center, the Graduate School of Education, as well as Student Administrative and Financial Services, the university bookstore, the Moriarty Library and the majority of the university's art galleries.

== Student life ==
=== Athletics ===
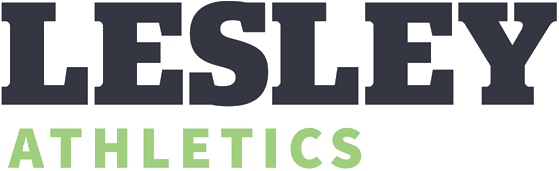
Lesley athletics wordmark

Lesley University participates in the NCAA Division III's New England Collegiate Conference. Its athletic teams' nickname is the Lynx.

| Men's sports | Women's sports |
|---|---|
| Baseball | Basketball |
| Basketball | Cross country |
| Cross country | Soccer |
| Soccer | Softball |
| Tennis | Tennis |
| Track and field | Track and field |
| Volleyball | Volleyball |

== Notable alumni ==
- Rosemarie Allen, early childhood education advocate
- Jacob Bannon, musician and vocalist for Converge
- Lloyd Carney, business executive, former Brocade CEO
- Joseph C. Carter, retired Brigadier General and former Adjutant General of Massachusetts National Guard
- Erika Christakis, early childhood educator and author
- Shealah Craighead, White House photographer
- Maxine Dibert, Alaska state representative
- Katharine Dukakis, author
- Eliza Dushku, retired actress
- Ken Fallin, illustrator for the Wall Street Journal
- Cindy Friedman, Massachusetts state senator
- Althea Garrison, politician
- Kevin Honan, Massachusetts state representative
- Candice Iloh, poet and author of Every Body Looking
- Joan Bennett Kennedy, socialite and first wife of Ted Kennedy
- Charlotte MacLeod, mystery novelist
- Andrew Mroczek, artist and curator
- Axie Oh, young adult author
- Esther Perel, psychotherapist
- Rhoda Perry, Rhode Island State Senator
- Rona Ramon, Israeli activist, widow of astronaut Ilan Ramon
- Lissa Rivera, artist and curator
- Edith Schloss, artist and writer
- Jessica Sonneborn, actress and filmmaker
- Caroll Spinney, puppeteer (Big Bird and Oscar the Grouch)
- Cynthia von Buhler, artist
- Andrea Wang, children's author of Watercress
- Jasmine Warga, children's author
- Erik Weihenmayer, first blind person to summit Mount Everest
