= Joseph B. Moore (American educator) =

Joseph B. Moore (born 1950) is an American educator and academic administrator. He is a former president of Lesley University and president of Empire State College.

== Education and career ==
Moore earned his B.A. degree in English from the University of Massachusetts Amherst, graduating summa cum laude; he earned an M.A. in English from the University of New Hampshire; and an Ed.D. in Education Administration from the University of Vermont. Moore's early experience includes teaching English in high schools in Vermont and New Hampshire.

He is a member of the Commission on Adult Learning and Educational Credentials of the American Council on Education (ACE) and the Committee on International Education of the American Association of State Colleges and Universities (AASCU), and vice chair of the Council for Adult and Experiential Learning (CAEL).

Moore served as provost and vice president for academic affairs at Mansfield University in Pennsylvania. He served as director of planning and academic affairs in the Office of the Chancellor of the Vermont State Colleges. He was the president of SUNY Empire State College in Saratoga Springs, New York.

On February 26, 2007, the trustees of Lesley University announced Moore's unanimous selection as president. He served as president of Lesley for nine years, until his retirement on June 30, 2016.
