= Shen Wei (artist) =

Chinese artist (born 1977)

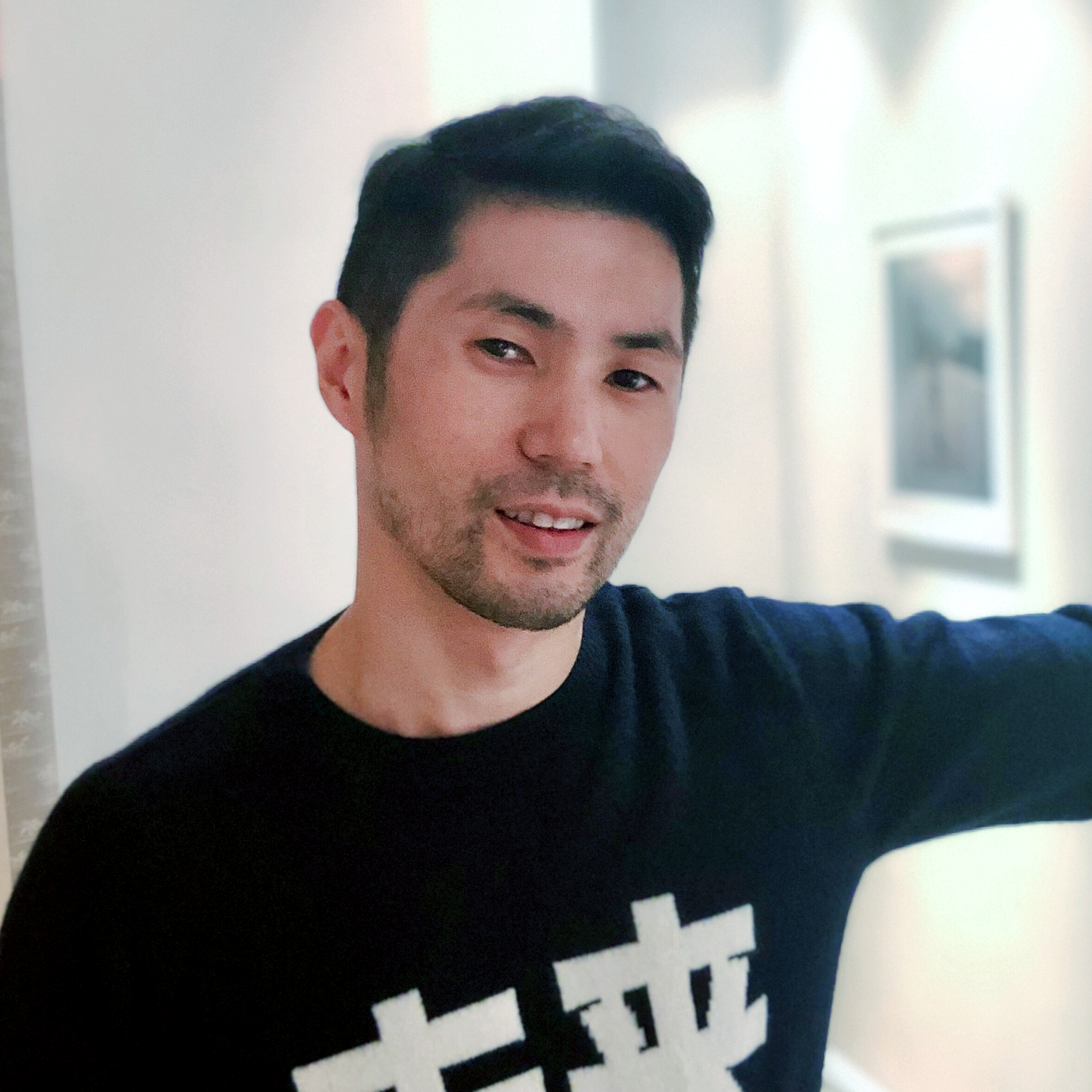
- Shen in his studio.
- Born: 1977 (age 48–49); Shanghai, China
- Known for: Photography, painting, video
- Website: shenwei.studio

Shen Wei (沈玮) (born 1977) is a Chinese-born American artist known for his intimate portraits of others and himself, as well as his poetic photographs of landscape and still-life. His works are part of the permanent collections at the Museum of Modern Art (New York), the J. Paul Getty Museum, and Philadelphia Museum of Art.

== Life and work ==
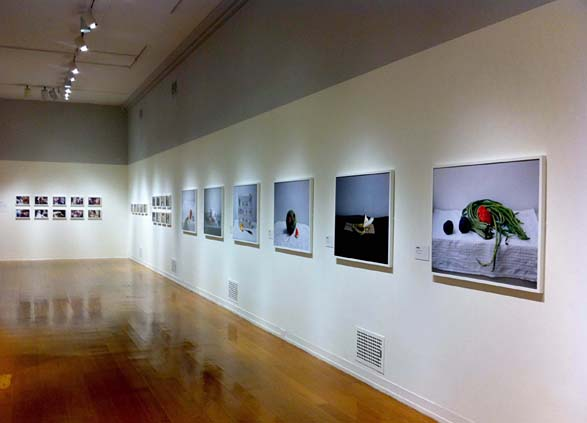
Shen's Table Setting series at the Museum of the City of New York's Moveable Feast exhibition. (March 2011)

His artistic style is frequently characterized as dream-like, elusive, and erotic. In addition to photography, Shen also works in painting, sculpture, and video.

In May 2021, the feature documentary film Almost Naked, directed by Liang Mai, followed Shen's creative process in producing self-portraits. The film premiered at the 16th Harlem International Film Festival in New York City.

== Publications ==
- Chinese Sentiment. Charles Lane Press. 2011. ISBN 978-0-9818770-2-0.
- Contact Sheet 169: Shen Wei. Light Work. 2012. ISBN 978-0-935445-81-7.
- Almost Naked. Jiazazhi Press. 2018. ISBN 978-988-14575-6-1.
- A Season Particular. TBW Books. 2025. ISBN 978-1-942953-70-8.

== Collections ==
Shen's work is held in the following public collections:

- Museum of Modern Art, New York, NY
- Museum of Contemporary Photography, Chicago, IL
- The J. Paul Getty Museum, Los Angeles, CA
- Philadelphia Museum of Art, Philadelphia, PA
- Morgan Library & Museum, New York, NY
- Carnegie Museum of Art, Pittsburgh, PA
- Library of Congress, Washington, D.C.
- Ringling Museum of Art, Sarasota, FL
- North Carolina Museum of Art, Raleigh, NC
- Harn Museum of Art, Gainesville, FL
