= Robert Stivers (photographer) =

American fine-art photographer (born 1953)

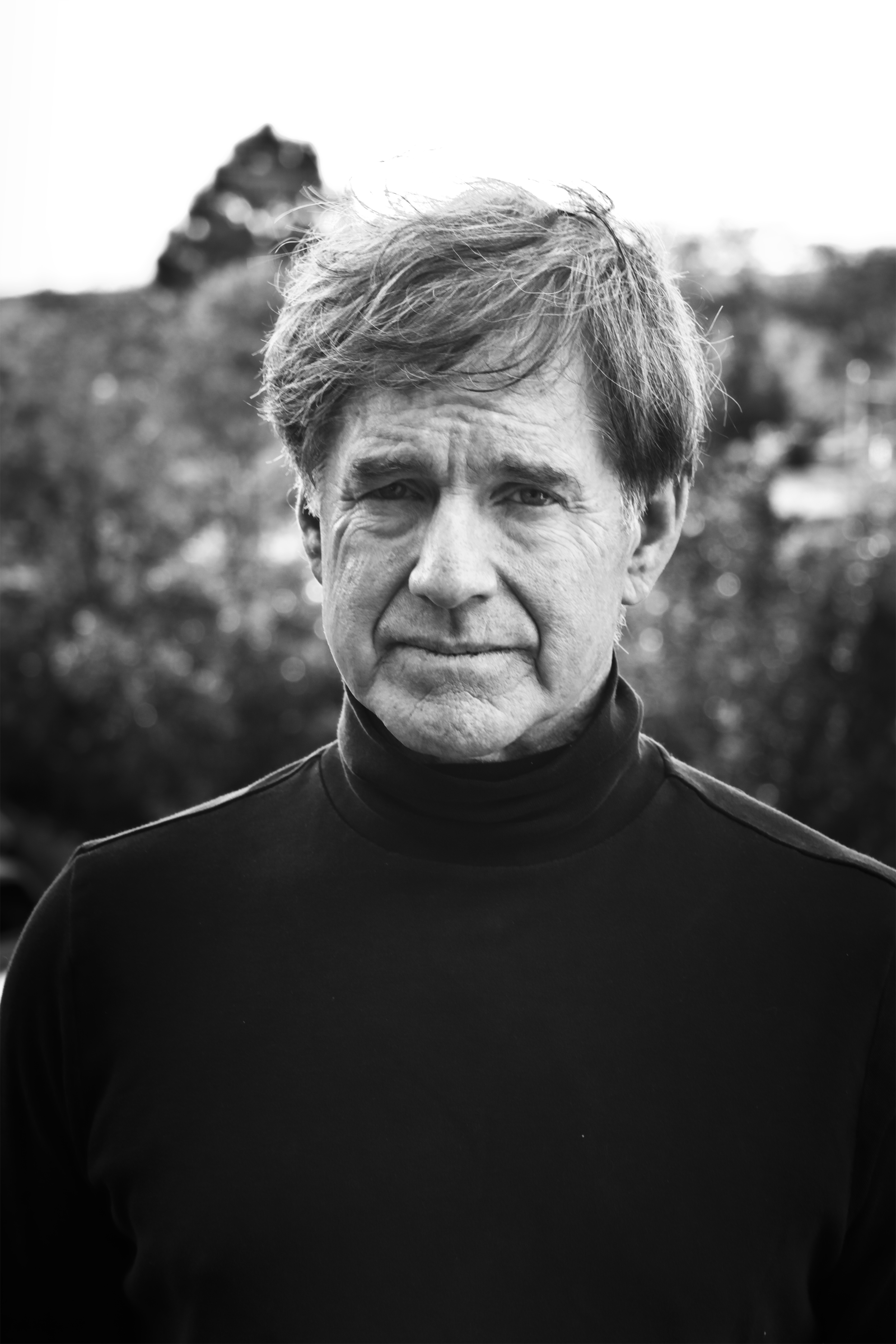
- Stivers in 2014
- Born: November 17, 1953 (age 72); Palo Alto, California; United States
- Occupation: Photographer
- Website: robertstivers.com

Robert Stivers (born November 17, 1953) is an American fine-art photographer. His work is collected by museums from New York to Paris and Cologne and shown in galleries worldwide.

Known for his images and darkroom technique, The New Yorker describes his work as "Ghostly black-and-white images whose theatricality smartly complements their mystery."

== Early years ==
Robert Stivers was born in Palo Alto, California to collegiate parents. His father had received a Ph.D. in civil engineering from Stanford and had a career as an aerospace engineer, while his mother had graduated summa cum laude from Stanford and went on to be politically involved in California. At a very young age he moved with his family to Pasadena, California where he attended Polytechnic Private School.

Stivers attended the University of California, Irvine and received his B.A. in 1976 studying history. During his time at UC, he took a dance class at the Jimmie DeFore Dance Center and, after graduating, decided to move to New York City in the late 1970s to pursue a career as a dancer.

In 1980, he performed with the Joffrey Ballet in New York City in a role in Moses Pendleton's revival of the old Dadaist ballet, Relâche.

He suffered a severe back injury that forced him to stop dancing for some time.

Following his injury, Stivers enrolled in graduate school at New York University where he studied Arts Management. He graduated in 1981 and began working at the American Ballet Theatre.

== Photography career ==
=== Transition to photography ===
After spending several years in California, Stivers decided to do something he felt was more purposeful. He began to meet photographers in his late twenties and ended up becoming an artists' representative in Los Angeles in 1983 for commercial photographers. He still felt like his creativity was being suppressed, but took the opportunity to learn about photography, studio lighting and printing.

In 1987, he took a photography class, titled "Finding your Own Vision," at UCLA under the instruction of art photographer Jo Ann Callis and was inspired to pursue fine-art photography. With a new inspiration and passion in 1988, at the age of 35, he began focusing on building his photography portfolio while living in Santa Monica.

=== Early works ===
Stivers relocated to Santa Fe in 1991, where he utilized his dance background in his photographic and film work. He would use a Super 8 camera to film himself dance. Stivers said, "I'd walk around on stage with my dance unfolding and the movie camera on fixed focus." He started to take still images of the monitor displaying his films and began to play with the framing and focus of these images.

This body of work became known as 'Series 5' and was shown at his first solo show in New York at Yancey Richardson Gallery in 1997. These photographs are also presented in his first book from Arena Editions, Robert Stivers: Photographs that was released in 1997. The Village Voice describes Stivers' images from 'Series 5' as "Livid figures nearly engulfed by a velvety, almost palpable darkness that are both ominous and gorgeous. More theatrical than Bill Jacobson's similarly isolated-and-soft-focus apparitions, these pictures suggest spiritual visions."

=== Books and later series ===
Stivers' second book Listening to Cement was published by Arena Editions in 2000. The book is composed of photographs from his 'Series 6' works, which included sea- and cloudscapes and architectural views, moving the viewer between indoors and outdoors.

Stivers' third book Sestina was published by Camera Work AG in 2003. This monograph was printed in 16-inch by 20-inch format. The book features rich bronze-toned prints of frayed objects and dream-like scenarios.

Stivers' fourth book Sanctum was published by Twin Palms in 2007. The book's essay was written by Eugenia Parry, who describes the work as "figments of his material philosophy of escape."

In 2010, Stivers came out with a series called Craving the Seamstress, in which he photographed objects he found throughout the house of his ex-wife, whom he calls a "collector of curiosities."

His sixth book, The Art of Ruin, was published by Twin Palms in the spring of 2015 with an essay by Steven Brown.

His newest book, Staging Pictures: Early Polaroids by Robert Stivers, was published by Dark Spring Press in 2017 with an essay by Robert Flynn Johnson.

== Style ==
Trend Magazine describes Stivers' work as "darkly romantic images infused with a certain mystery that have made him one of our foremost contemporary photographers."

He works with gelatin silver and platinum prints to create his images. Since he began shooting in 1987, he has used Hasselblad medium-format cameras.

In 1993 Stivers stepped away from printing clear photographs and began his process of using a sharply focused negative that is then manipulated in the darkroom to create out-of-focus, blurry images. This effect causes intentional loss of clarity to achieve sensual, dream-like works akin to early Pictorialism at the turn of the twentieth century.

Stivers remarks that the photographs mirror his own process of self-transformation and re-creation. His distorting power reinvigorates classical tropes like nudes, sculpture, texture and architecture.

== Collections ==
Robert Stivers' photographs are held by The Metropolitan Museum of Art in New York, the J. Paul Getty Museum in Los Angeles, the Museum of Fine Arts in Boston, the Bibliothèque nationale de France, the Fogg Museum at Harvard University, the Los Angeles County Museum of Art, the Brooklyn Museum of Art, the Victoria and Albert Museum in London, the Museum of Contemporary Photography in Chicago, and the Museum Ludwig in Cologne.

His work is collected by Ellen DeGeneres, Charlize Theron, Olivia Wilde, and Donna Karan.

== Selected books ==
- Robert Stivers: Photographs. Santa Fe: Arena Editions. 1997. ISBN 978-0-9657280-0-3.
- Listening to Cement. Santa Fe: Arena Editions. 2000. ISBN 978-1-892041-33-3.
- Sestina. New York: Channel Photographics. 2004. ISBN 978-0-9744029-2-5; clamshell: ISBN 978-1-931885-60-7-lc.
- Sanctum. Santa Fe: Twin Palms. 2007. ISBN 978-1-931885-57-7.
- Light Quartet: Themes and Variations. Beijing: see+ gallery. 2009.
- The Art of Ruin. Santa Fe: Twin Palms. 2015. ISBN 978-1-936611-08-9; signed: ISBN 978-1-936611-08-9-s.
- Staging Pictures. Tucson: Dark Spring Press. 2017. ISBN 978-0-9993408-1-3.
