= Travis (chimpanzee) =

Chimpanzee known for attacking a person

- Travis in 2003
- Species: Chimpanzee
- Sex: Male
- Born: October 21, 1995; Festus, Missouri, U.S.
- Died: February 16, 2009 (aged 13); Stamford, Connecticut, U.S.
- Cause of death: Gunshot wounds
- Known for: Attack on Charla Nash
- Owners: Jerome Herold (died 2004); Sandra Herold (died 2010)
- Weight: 200 lb (91 kg)

Travis (October 21, 1995 – February 16, 2009) was a male chimpanzee who was raised by and lived with Sandra Herold in Stamford, Connecticut. On February 16, 2009, the chimpanzee mauled Herold's friend Charla Nash, severing several body parts and severely lacerating her face, leaving her blind and disfigured. Travis was shot dead by the responding police officer.

The incident received international attention and sparked a debate over the ethics of keeping primates as pets. In the aftermath, the Captive Primate Safety Act was reintroduced to add chimpanzees, among other primates, to the list of "prohibited wildlife species" that cannot be sold or purchased through interstate and foreign sales. The bill died in committee but was reintroduced in 2024, ending with the 118th congress, before being reintroduced in the 119th congress.

== Socialization ==
Travis was born to Suzy and Coco, who were wild-caught in an unconfirmed African country and brought to the U.S. in the 1970s. Travis was born near Festus, Missouri, on October 21, 1995, at Mike and Connie Braun Casey's compound, then called "Chimparty" and later renamed by the Missouri Primate Foundation. In a separate incident, Suzy was fatally shot following an escape in 2001. Sandra and Jerome Herold purchased Travis for $50,000 after he was taken from Suzy at three days old. They named him after Sandra's favorite singer, Travis Tritt.

Sandra and Jerome raised Travis at their home on Rockrimmon Road in the North Stamford section of Stamford, Connecticut. He was their constant companion and often accompanied them to work and on their shopping excursions in town. They owned a towing company, and Travis posed for photos at the shop and rode in the tow truck, his seat belt buckled as he wore a baseball shirt. He became well known in the town and had been known to greet police officers they encountered when towing cars. As a juvenile, he appeared in several television shows and commercials, including spots for Pepsi, as well as on television programs including The Maury Povich Show and The Man Show, though it has been disputed whether he is the same chimpanzee who made these appearances.

Travis had been socialized among humans since birth. A neighbor said he used to play around and wrestle with him. The neighbor added that Travis always knew when to stop and paid close attention to Sandra, and remarked that "[Travis] listened better than my nephews". He could open doors using keys, dress himself, water plants, feed hay to Sandra and Jerome's horses, eat at a table with the family, and drink wine from a stemmed glass. He was so fond of ice cream that he learned the schedules of passing ice cream trucks. He logged onto the computer to look at pictures, watched television using a remote control, and brushed his teeth using a Water Pik. He weighed 200 pounds (91 kg), classed as "significantly obese" for a chimpanzee. He enjoyed watching baseball on television. He had also driven a car on several occasions.

Sandra's only child, Suzan, was killed in a car accident in September 2000, and Jerome died of cancer in April 2004; as a result, Sandra regarded Travis almost as a surrogate son and pampered him. She slept and bathed with him, saying after his 2009 death, "I'm, like, hollow now. He slept with me every night. Until you've eaten with a chimp and bathed with a chimp, you don't know a chimp."

== Incidents ==
=== 2003 incident ===
On October 19, 2003, Travis escaped from Sandra's car and held up traffic at a busy intersection; he was on the loose for several hours. The incident began after a pedestrian threw an empty soda bottle at the car, which went through a partially open window and struck Travis while they were stopped at a red light. Startled, he unbuckled his seat belt, got out of the car, and chased the pedestrian, but missed him. When police arrived, they lured Travis into the car several times, only for him to let himself out of another door and occasionally chase them around the car.

The 2003 incident led the Connecticut General Assembly to enact a law prohibiting the ownership of primates weighing more than 50 pounds (23 kg) as pets and requiring owners of exotic pets to apply for permits. The new law took effect in 2009, and as of Travis' death later that year, no one in the state had applied to adopt a chimpanzee. The Connecticut Department of Environmental Protection (DEP) did not enforce the law on Sandra and Jerome because they had owned Travis for so long, and the DEP did not believe he posed a public safety risk.

=== 2009 attack and death ===
On February 16, 2009, at around 3:40 pm, Travis attacked and mauled Sandra's 55-year-old friend, Charla Nash, inflicting devastating injuries to her face and limbs. Travis had taken Sandra's car keys and left the house with them. Sandra asked Charla to help get him back inside, but upon seeing Charla holding an Elmo doll, one of his favorite toys, he flew into a rage and attacked her. He was familiar with her, as she had also worked at Sandra and Jerome's towing company, although she had a different hairstyle and was driving a different car at the time of the attack, which may have confused and alarmed him. Sandra had previously given Travis tea which she had laced with Xanax. He was also on medications for Lyme disease. Sandra attempted to stop Travis by beating him over the head with a shovel and stabbing him in the back with a butcher knife.

Sandra later said, "For me to do something like that, put a knife in him, was like putting one in myself". She said Travis turned around as if to say, "Mom, what did you do?" She, at this point, believing Charla to be dead, then rushed to her car, locked herself inside, and called 9-1-1. Travis' screams can be heard in the background at the beginning of the recording of the 9-1-1 call as Sandra pleads for the police, who initially believed the call to be a hoax until she cried, "He's eating her!" Emergency medical services waited for police before approaching the house. When they arrived, Travis headed toward the police car, tried to open a locked passenger door, and smashed a side-view mirror. He then walked to the driver's side door and opened it, at which point the police officer Frank Chiafari shot the chimpanzee four times with his service pistol. Travis retreated inside the house, where he was found dead next to his cage.

== Aftermath ==
The paramedic crew described Charla's injuries as "horrendous". Within the following 72 hours, she underwent more than seven hours of surgery on her face and hands by four teams of surgeons. The hospital provided counseling to staff members who initially treated her because of the extraordinary nature of her wounds. Doctors noted she had lost her eyelids, nose, lips, mid-face bone structure, and nine fingers. Doctors removed some of Travis' hair and teeth that were embedded in her bones and reattached her jaw, but announced on April 7, 2009 that she would be blind for life due to both eyes becoming infected after the attack. Her injuries made her a possible candidate for an experimental face transplant surgery. After initial treatment at Stamford Hospital, she was transferred to the Cleveland Clinic. Her family started a trust fund to raise money to pay her "unfathomable" medical bills and support her daughter. She revealed her face in public for the first time since the attack on The Oprah Winfrey Show on November 11, 2009. She was not in physical pain from the attack at that time, and relatives said she hoped to leave the Cleveland Clinic soon. Pictures have surfaced on the Internet displaying her face before and after the attack.

Per standard procedure, Travis' head was taken to the state laboratory for a rabies test and his body was taken to the University of Connecticut for a necropsy. The head tested negative for rabies, but Xanax remained in his system. In May 2009, Necropsy results confirmed that Travis was overweight and had been stabbed. Travis's remains were cremated at All Pets Crematory in Stamford on February 25, 2009. Toxicology reports confirmed Sandra's statement that she had given Travis Xanax-laced tea the day of the attack.

Shortly after the attack, a woman who had lived in the same area as Sandra came forward with the claim that in 1996, Travis had bitten her hand and tried to pull her into a vehicle as she greeted him. She claimed to have complained to Sandra, Jerome, the Stamford police, and the Connecticut State police, who stated they had no record of any such complaint. Additionally, a man also came forward with information that, in 1998, Travis had bitten his hand and thumb as he went to pick up his toy after Travis dropped it. Afterward, PETA members allegedly harassed Sandra, although the organization stated that it did not have any official involvement.

Sandra was reportedly deeply traumatized not only by the mauling of her friend but also by the loss of Travis. After his death, her stepdaughter and a friend said in interviews that she tried to relieve her grief by feeding deer and other animals in her backyard as well as purchasing another chimpanzee named Chance from an animal trainer in Florida. At that time, owning a pet chimpanzee in Connecticut was illegal, so she travelled to Florida, where Chance lived with the trainer, to visit him.

On May 24, 2010, 15 months after the attack, Sandra died suddenly of a ruptured aortic aneurysm at the age of 72. Her attorney, Robert Golger, released the following statement: "Ms. Herold had suffered a series of heartbreaking losses over the last several years, beginning with the death of her first and only daughter who was killed in a car accident, then her husband, then her beloved chimp, Travis, as well as the tragic maiming of friend and employee Charla Nash. In the end, her heart, which had been broken so many times before, could take no more."

On May 28, 2011, Charla underwent transplant surgery performed by a team led by Bohdan Pomahač at Brigham and Women's Hospital, receiving a donated face and hands. The transplant of the hands was initially successful but, when she developed pneumonia shortly thereafter, doctors were forced to remove them five days after the transplant due to the infection and resulting poor circulation.

=== Lawsuits ===
In March 2009, Charla's family attorney filed a $50 million lawsuit against Sandra (equivalent to $75 million in 2025). On May 6, a Stamford judge froze her assets, valued at $10 million ($15 million in 2025). Other potential defendants were the DEP, the city of Stamford, and the veterinarian who prescribed the Xanax. The defense claimed Travis had no violent behavior before the attack, that it was an act of provocation, and that he had no teeth; he denied that the 1998 attack occurred. In November 2012, Charla settled with Sandra's estate and received approximately $4 million ($6 million in 2025).

Charla attempted to sue the state of Connecticut in 2013 but her claim was denied. She had claimed that officials knew Travis was dangerous but did nothing about it. Her petition to sue was denied on the basis that, at the time of the attack, no statute existed that prohibited the private ownership of a chimpanzee. In July 2013, her attorneys began efforts to appeal the court's decision. The appeal was ultimately denied in April 2014.

=== In media ===
News reports of the incident spread as far away as Ireland, China, and Russia. The attack, reminiscent of another one that occurred four years earlier in California, provoked discussion by sources such as Time magazine and primatologists Jane Goodall and Frans de Waal about the logic of keeping such exotic animals as pets.

Reality television actress Kim Kardashian received criticism for posting photos of her family with a three-year-old chimpanzee on her blog only days after the attack. The chimpanzee had been rented for her television show, Keeping Up with the Kardashians. She apologized and noted, "I understand my timing was not appropriate, and it was insensitive of me. What happened to the woman that was attacked by the chimpanzee was devastating. In no way did I mean to insult or offend anyone by posting these pictures."

Travis's escape and Charla's subsequent attack were used as part of the "Chimps" episode of Animal Planet's 2010–2011 documentary series Fatal Attractions. Sound from the original 911 call and radio traffic from Travis' police shooting was used in it. In June 2009, American deathcore band Suicide Silence released their second album No Time to Bleed, featuring the track "...And Then She Bled", a song recreation of the 911 emergency phone call placed by Sandra during the attack.

A similar attack is depicted in the 2022 film Nope, in which an animal actor chimpanzee named Gordy is startled on the set and attacks his human costars before being shot dead by police. In the film, a young girl mauled by him is shown years later to wear a mesh covering over her severely disfigured face similar to the one worn by Charla.

=== Influence on legislation ===
Connecticut Attorney General Richard Blumenthal noted that a defect in the existing 2004 Connecticut law prohibiting chimpanzees Travis' size, itself a result of the 2003 incident, allowed the attack to occur. A Connecticut DEP spokesperson clarified that Travis was exempt because he did not appear to present a public health risk and was owned before the registration requirement began. The DEP was seeking a law banning large primates and, after the incident, announced that it sought the help of the public, police officers, and animal control officers to report such pets to the agency. The editorial board of the Stamford Advocate newspaper also supported banning the possession of all exotic birds, reptiles and other wild animals.

U.S. Representative Earl Blumenauer of Oregon introduced the Captive Primate Safety Act on January 6, 2009, which would have added chimpanzees, monkeys, great apes, gorillas, lemurs, and tarsiers to the list of "prohibited wildlife species" that cannot be sold or purchased through interstate and foreign sales. The attack led the Humane Society of the United States to join the Wildlife Conservation Society in supporting the Act. It resulted in the bill's reintroduction by co-sponsor Rep. Mark Kirk on February 23, 2009. Rep. Rob Bishop argued against the bill during the floor debate, noting that it would cost $4 million annually and do nothing directly to prevent chimpanzee attacks on humans. He also claimed such attacks are relatively rare. Twenty states and the District of Columbia already have laws banning primates as pets. On February 23, 2009, the House voted 323 to 95 in favor of the bill, and the editorial boards of several major newspapers, including The New York Times and Newsday, supported its passage.

Officer Frank Chiafari, who fatally shot Travis, was initially unable to get therapy for his depression and anxiety after the attack. This led to legislation proposed in 2010 that would cover a police officer's compensation for mental or emotional impairment after using justifiable deadly force to kill an animal.

== See also ==
- List of individual apes
- Chimp Crazy (episodes 2 and 4)
- St. James Davis chimpanzee attack
