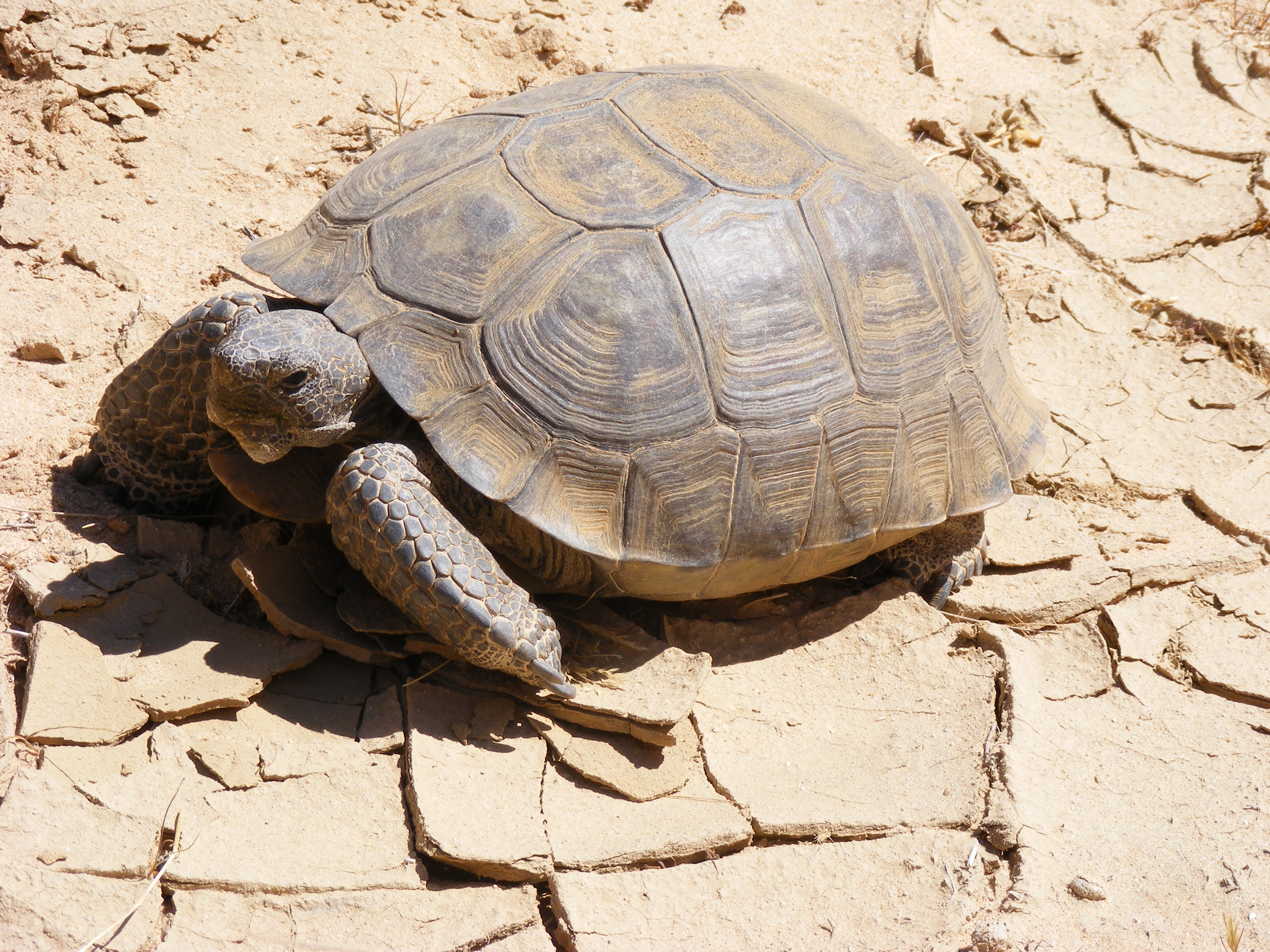
- Agassiz's desert tortoise, G. agassizii

Conservation status
- Critically Endangered (IUCN 3.1)
- CITES Appendix II

Scientific classification
- Kingdom: Animalia
- Phylum: Chordata
- Class: Reptilia
- Order: Testudines
- Suborder: Cryptodira
- Family: Testudinidae
- Genus: Gopherus
- Species: G. agassizii

Binomial name
- Gopherus agassizii (Cooper, 1863)

Synonyms
- Xerobates agassizii Cooper, 1863; Testudo agassizii — Cope, 1875; Xerobates agassizi [sic] Garman, 1884 (ex errore); Gopherus agassizii — Stejneger, 1893; Testudo aggassizi [sic] Ditmars, 1907 (ex errore); Testudo agassizi — Ditmars, 1907; Gopherus agassizi — V. Tanner, 1927; Testudo agasizzi [sic] Kallert, 1927 (ex errore); Gopherus polyphemus agassizii — Mertens & Wermuth, 1955; Gopherus agassiz [sic] Malkin, 1962 (ex errore); Gopherus polyphemus agassizi — Frair, 1964; Geochelone agassizii — Honegger, 1980; Scaptochelys agassizii — Bramble, 1982; Scaptochelys agassizi — Morafka, Aguirre & Murphy, 1994

= Desert tortoise =

Species of tortoise

The desert tortoise (Gopherus agassizii) is a species of tortoise in the family Testudinidae. The species is native to the Mojave and Sonoran Deserts of the southwestern United States and northwestern Mexico, and to the Sinaloan thornscrub of northwestern Mexico. G. agassizii is distributed in western Arizona, southeastern California, southern Nevada, and southwestern Utah. The specific name agassizii is in honor of Swiss-American zoologist Jean Louis Rodolphe Agassiz. The desert tortoise is the official state reptile in California and Nevada.

The desert tortoise lives 70 to 80 years on average; it grows slowly and generally has a low reproductive rate. It spends most of its time in burrows, rock shelters, and pallets to regulate body temperature and reduce water loss. It is most active after seasonal rains and is inactive during most of the year. This inactivity helps reduce water loss during hot periods, whereas winter brumation facilitates survival during freezing temperatures and low food availability. Desert tortoises can tolerate water, salt, and energy imbalances on a daily basis, which increases their lifespans.

== Taxonomy ==
In 2011, on the basis of DNA, geographic, and behavioral differences between desert tortoises east and west of the Colorado River, it was decided that two species of desert tortoises exist: Agassiz's desert tortoise (Gopherus agassizii) and Morafka's desert tortoise (Gopherus morafkai). The new species name is in honor of the late Professor David Joseph Morafka of California State University, Dominguez Hills, in recognition of his many contributions to the study and conservation of Gopherus. G. morafkai occurs east of the Colorado River in Arizona, as well as in the states of Sonora and Sinaloa, Mexico. The acceptance of G. morafkai reduced the range of G. agassizii by about 70% In 2016, based on a large-scale genetic analysis, ecological and morphological data, researchers proposed a split between the Sonoran and Sinaloan populations. This southernmost member of the Gopherus genus was named G. evgoodei, Goode's thornscrub tortoise.

== Description ==
These tortoises may attain a length of 25 to 36 cm (10 to 14 in), with males being slightly larger than females. A male tortoise has a longer gular horn than a female, his plastron (lower shell) is concave compared to a female tortoise. Males have larger tails than females do. Their shells are high-domed, and greenish-tan to dark brown in color. The high domes of their shells allow for space for their lungs, which helps them maintain thermoregulation, also known as maintaining internal temperature. Desert tortoises can grow to 10–15 cm (4–6 in) in height. They can range in weight from 8 to 15 pounds, or 3.5 kg to 7 kg. The front limbs have sharp, claw-like scales and are flattened for digging. Back legs are skinnier and very long.

== Habitat ==
Desert tortoises can live in areas with ground temperatures exceeding 60 °C (140 °F) because of their ability to dig burrows and escape the heat. At least 95% of their lives are spent in burrows. There, they are also protected from freezing winter weather while dormant, from November through February or March. Within their burrows, these tortoises create a subterranean environment that can be beneficial to other reptiles, mammals, birds, and invertebrates.

Scientists have divided the desert tortoise into three species: Agassiz's and Morafka's desert tortoises, with a third species, Goode's thornscrub tortoise, in northern Sinaloa and southern Sonora, Mexico. An isolated population of Agassiz's desert tortoise occurs in the Black Mountains of northwestern Arizona. They live in a different type of habitat, from sandy flats to rocky foothills. They have a strong proclivity in the Mojave Desert for alluvial fans, washes, and canyons where more suitable soils for den construction might be found. They range from near sea level to around 1,050 m (3,500 ft) in elevation. Tortoises show very strong site fidelity, and have well-established home ranges where they know where their food, water, and mineral resources are.

Desert tortoises inhabit elevations from below mean sea level in Death Valley to 1,600 m (5,300 ft) in Arizona, though they are most common from around 300 to 1,050 m (1,000 to 3,500 ft). Estimates of densities vary from less than 8/km^{2} (21/sq mi) on sites in southern California to over 500/km^{2} (1,300/sq mi) in the western Mojave Desert, although most estimates are less than 150/km^{2} (390/sq mi). The home range generally consists of 4 to 40 hectares (10 to 100 acres). In general, males have larger home ranges than females, and home range size increases with increasing resources and rainfall.

Desert tortoises are sensitive to the soil type, owing to their reliance on burrows for shelter, reduction of water loss, and regulation of body temperature. The soil should crumble easily during digging and be firm enough to resist collapse. Desert tortoises prefer sandy loam soils with varying amounts of gravel and clay, and tend to avoid sands or soils with low water-holding capacity, excess salts, or low resistance to flooding. They may consume soil to maintain adequate calcium levels, and may prefer sites with higher calcium content.

With the creation of off-road vehicles more humans are making their way in and out of the desert tortoises' home environment.

=== Shelters ===
Desert tortoises spend most of their lives in burrows, rock shelters, and pallets to regulate body temperature and reduce water loss. Burrows are tunnels dug into soil by desert tortoises or other animals, rock shelters are spaces protected by rocks and/or boulders, and pallets are depressions in the soil. The use of the various shelter types is related to their availability and climate. The number of burrows used, the extent of repetitive use, and the occurrence of burrow sharing are variable. Males tend to occupy deeper burrows than females. Seasonal trends in burrow use are influenced by desert tortoise sex and regional variation. Desert tortoise shelter sites are often associated with plant or rock cover. Desert tortoises often lay their eggs in nests dug in sufficiently deep soil at the entrance of burrows or under shrubs. Nests are typically 8 to 25 centimetres (3 to 10 inches) deep.

Shelters are important for controlling body temperature and water regulation, as they allow desert tortoises to slow their rate of heating in summer and provide protection from cold during the winter. The humidity within burrows prevents dehydration. Burrows also provide protection from predators. The availability of adequate burrow sites influences desert tortoise densities.

Each desert tortoise uses about 5 to 25 burrows per year. Some burrows are used repeatedly, sometimes for several consecutive years. Desert tortoises share burrows with various mammals, reptiles, birds, and invertebrates, such as white-tailed antelope squirrels (Ammospermophilus leucurus), woodrats (Neotoma), collared peccaries (Dicolytes tajacu), burrowing owls (Athene cunicularia), Gambel's quail (Callipepla gambelii ), rattlesnakes (Crotalus spp.), Gila monsters (Heloderma suspectum), beetles, spiders, and scorpions. One burrow can host up to 23 desert tortoises – such sharing is more common for desert tortoises of opposite sexes than for desert tortoises of the same sex.

== Lifecycle ==
=== Reproduction ===
Tortoises mate in the spring and autumn. Male desert tortoises grow two large white glands around the chin area, called chin glands, that signify mating season. A male circles around the female, biting her shell in the process. He then climbs upon the female and insert his penis (a white organ, usually only seen upon careful inspection during mating, as it is hidden inside the male and can only be coaxed out with sexual implication) into the cloaca of a female, which is located around the tail. The male may make grunting noises once atop a female, and may move his front legs up and down in a constant motion, as if playing a drum.

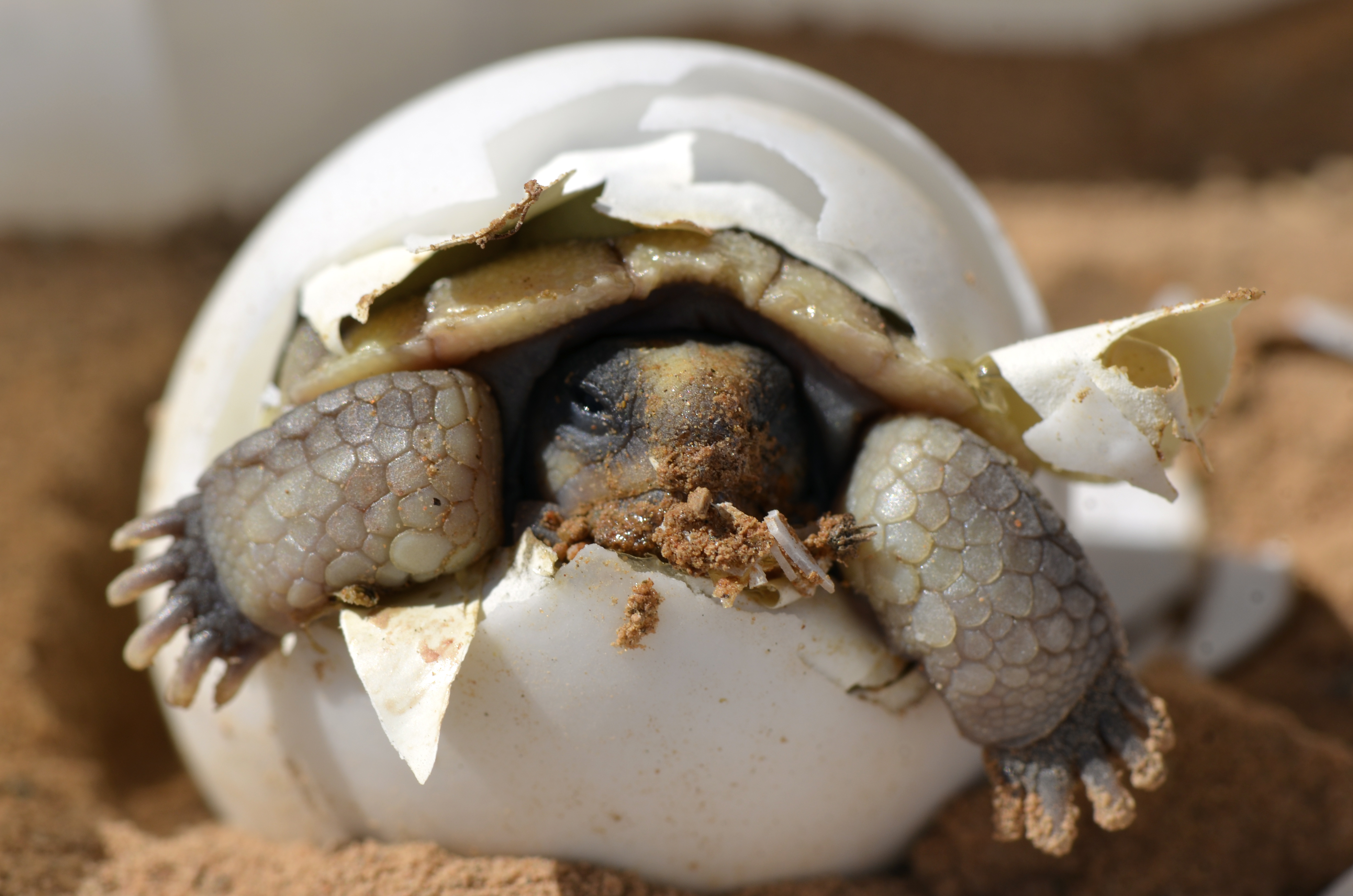
Hatching baby desert tortoise

Months later, the female lays a clutch of four to eight hard-shelled eggs, which have the size and shape of ping-pong balls, usually in June or July. The eggs hatch in August or September. Wild female tortoises produce up to three clutches a year depending on the climate. Their eggs incubate from 90 to 135 days; some eggs may overwinter and hatch the following spring. In a laboratory experiment, temperature influenced hatching rates and hatchling sex. Incubation temperatures from 27 to 31 °C (81 to 88 °F) resulted in hatching rates exceeding 83%, while incubation at 25 °C (77 °F) resulted in a 53% hatching rate. Incubation temperatures less than 31 °C (88 °F) resulted in all-male clutches. Average incubation time decreased from 124.7 days at 25 °C (77 °F) to 78.2 days at 31 °C (88 °F).

The desert tortoise is one of the few known tortoises in existence that has been observed engaging in homosexual intercourse One possible explanation for this could be the social component of gaining and establishing dominance.

=== Maturation ===
The desert tortoise grows slowly, often taking 16 years or longer to reach about 20 cm (8 in) in length. The growth rate varies with age, location, gender and precipitation. It can slow down from 12 mm/year for ages 4–8 years to about 6.0 mm/year for ages 16 to 20 years. Males and females grow at similar rates; females can grow slightly faster when young, but males grow larger than females.

Desert tortoises reach their reproductive maturity at ages 15 to 20, when they become longer than 18 cm (7 in). However, it is possible for them to mature faster as 10-year-old females that are able to reproduce have been observed.

=== Activity ===
Their activity depends on location, peaking in late spring for the Mojave Desert and in late summer to fall in the Sonoran Desert; some populations exhibit two activity peaks during one year. Desert tortoises brumate during winters, roughly from November to February–April. Females begin brumating later and emerge earlier than males; juveniles emerge from brumation earlier than adults.

Temperature strongly influences desert tortoise activity level. Although desert tortoises can survive body temperatures from below freezing to over 40 °C (104 °F), most activity occurs at temperatures from 26 to 34 °C (79 to 93 °F). The influence of temperature is reflected in daily activity patterns, with desert tortoises often active late in the morning during spring and fall, early in the morning and late in the evening during the summer, and occasionally becoming active during relatively warm winter afternoons. The activity generally increases after rainfall.

Although desert tortoises spend the majority of their time in shelter, movements of up to 200 m (660 ft) per day are common. The common, comparatively short-distance movements presumably represent foraging activity, traveling between burrows, and possibly mate-seeking or other social behaviors. Long-distance movements could potentially represent dispersal into new areas and/or use of peripheral portions of the home range.

=== Lifespan ===
The lifespan of a desert tortoise can vary from 50 to 80 years. The main causes of mortality in desert tortoises include predators, human-related causes, diseases, and environmental factors such as drought, flooding, and fire.

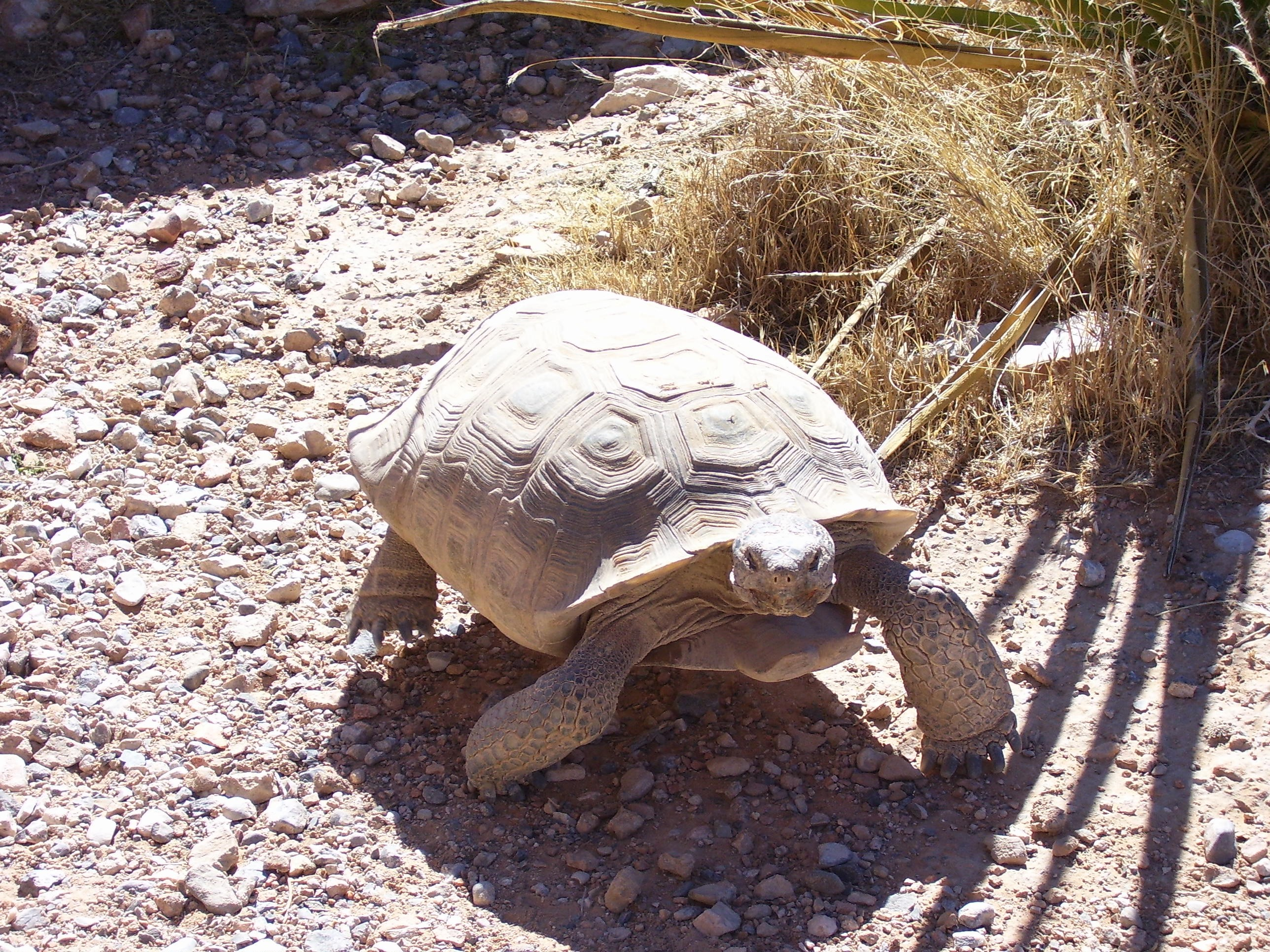
Desert tortoise with an estimated age of 63 years. Red Rock Canyon National Conservation Area, Nevada

The annual death rate of adults is typically a few percent, but is much higher for young desert tortoises. Only 2–5% of hatchlings are estimated to reach maturity. Estimates of survival from hatching to 1 year of age for Mojave Desert tortoises range from 47 to 51%. Survival of Mojave Desert tortoises from 1 to 4 years of age is 71–89%.

=== Diet ===

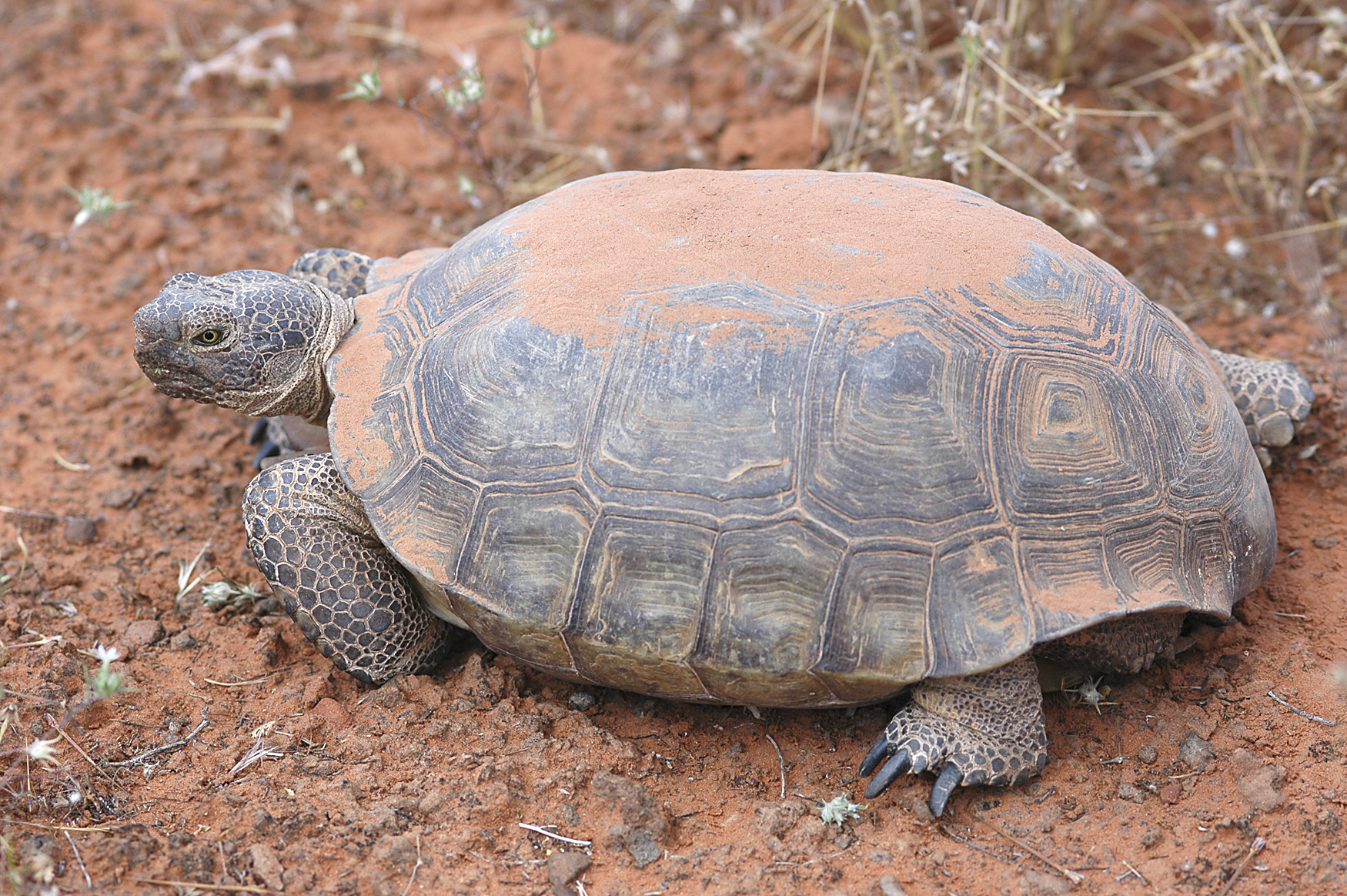

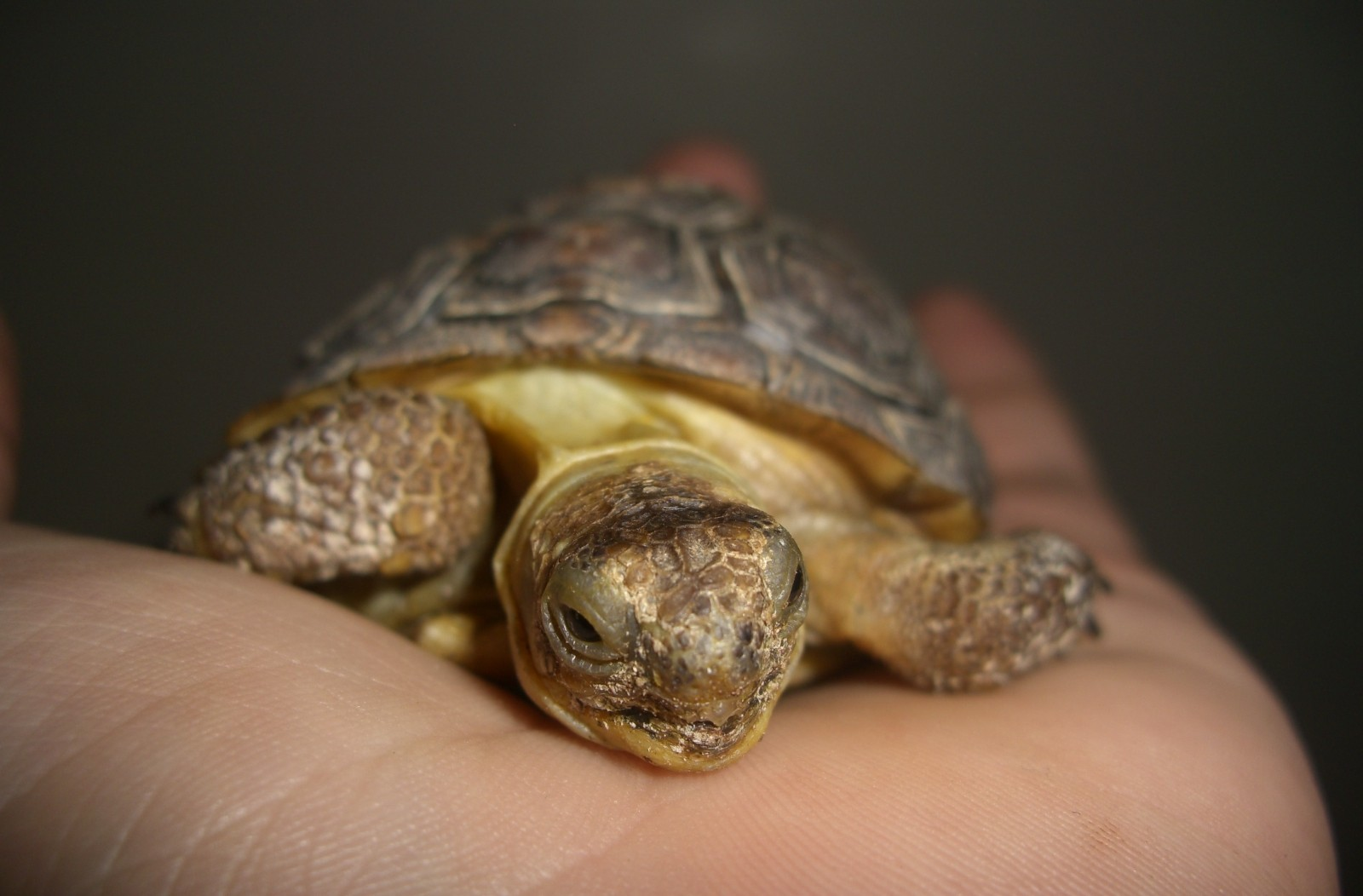
A young desert tortoise

The desert tortoise is an herbivore. Grasses form the bulk of its diet, but it also eats herbs, annual wildflowers, and new growth of cacti, as well as their fruit and flowers. Rocks and soil are also ingested, perhaps as a means of maintaining intestinal digestive bacteria as a source of supplementary calcium or other minerals. As with birds, stones may also function as gastroliths, enabling more efficient digestion of plant material in the stomach.

Much of the tortoise's water intake comes from moisture in the grasses and wildflowers they consume in the spring. A large urinary bladder can store over 40% of the tortoise's body weight in water, urea, uric acid, and nitrogenous wastes. During very dry times, they may give off waste as a white paste rather than a watery urine. During periods of adequate rainfall, they drink copiously from any pools they find, and eliminate solid urates. The tortoises can increase their body weight by up to 40% after copious drinking. Adult tortoises can survive a year or more without access to water. During the summer and dry seasons, they rely on the water contained within cactus fruits and mesquite grass. To maintain sufficient water, they reabsorb water in their bladders, and move to humid burrows in the morning to prevent water loss by evaporation.

A desert tortoise can empty its bladder as one of its defense mechanisms. This can leave the tortoise in a very vulnerable condition in dry areas, since the tortoise will no longer have a backup water supply. If a tortoise is seen in the wild, you should not handle, or pick them up unless they are in imminent danger. Handling of tortoises may have consequences for the animal, such as the development of upper respiratory tract infections.

=== Predation and conservation status ===
Ravens, Gila monsters, kit foxes, badgers, roadrunners, coyotes, and fire ants are all natural predators of the desert tortoise. They prey on eggs, juveniles, which are 50–75 mm (2–3 in) long with a thin, delicate shell, or, in some cases, adults. Ravens are thought to cause significant levels of juvenile tortoise predation in some areas of the Mojave Desert – frequently near urbanized areas. The most significant threats to tortoises include urbanization, disease, habitat destruction and fragmentation, illegal collection and vandalism by humans, and habitat conversion from invasive plant species (Brassica tournefortii, Bromus rubens and Erodium spp.).

Desert tortoise populations in some areas have declined by as much as 90% since the 1980s, and the Mojave population is listed as threatened under the Endangered Species Act of 1973 in 1990, after being listed as endangered, or threatened in the case of the Beaver Dam Slope, Utah population, under an emergency rule in 1989. All desert tortoises are protected under law of the United States based on similarity of appearance to tortoises of the protected Mojave population. It is unlawful to touch, harm, harass, or collect wild desert tortoises. It is, however, possible to adopt captive tortoises through the Tortoise Adoption Program in Arizona, Utah Division of Wildlife Resources Desert Tortoise Adoption Program in Utah, Joshua Tree Tortoise Rescue Project in California, or through Bureau of Land Management in Nevada. When adopted in Nevada, they will have a computer chip embedded on their backs for reference. According to Arizona Game and Fish Commission Rule R12-4-407 A.1, they may be possessed if the tortoises are obtained from a captive source which is properly documented. Commission Order 43: Reptile Notes 3: one tortoise per family member.

The Fort Irwin National Training Center of the US Army expanded into an area that was habitat for about 2,000 desert tortoises, and contained critical desert tortoise habitat (a designation by the US Fish and Wildlife Service). In March 2008, about 650 tortoises were moved by helicopter and vehicle, up to 35 km away. The Desert Tortoise Preserve Committee protects roughly 2,000 hectares (5,000 acres) of desert tortoise habitat from human activity. This area includes 1,760 hectares (4,340 acres) in Kern County, 290 hectares (710 acres) in San Bernardino County, and 32 hectares (80 acres) in Riverside County.

Another potential threat to the desert tortoise's habitat is a series of proposed wind and solar farms. As a result of legislation, solar energy companies have been making plans for huge projects in the desert regions of Arizona, California, Colorado, New Mexico, Nevada, and Utah. The requests submitted to the Bureau of Land Management total nearly 7,300 km^{2} (1,800,000 acres).

While tortoises are made to withstand tough conditions and high temperatures, they are unable to cope with the dangers of human development, such as the use of off-roading vehicles. These vehicles that come along at high speeds have the potential to crush and kill tortoises, running over their eggs and burrows and significantly impacting their population.

== Human development ==
=== Ivanpah solar power project ===
Concerns about the impacts of the Ivanpah Solar thermal project led the developers to hire some 100 biologists and spend US$22 million caring for the tortoises on or near the site during construction. Despite this, in a 2011 Revised Biological Assessment for the Ivanpah Solar Electric Generating System, the Bureau of Land Management anticipated the loss or significant degradation of 1,420 hectares (3,520 acres) of tortoise habitat and the harm of 57–274 adult tortoises, 608 juveniles, and 236 eggs inside the work area, and 203 adult tortoises and 1,541 juvenile tortoises outside the work area. The Bureau of Land Management (BLM) expects that most of the juvenile tortoises on the project will be killed.

== Lawsuits ==
In the summer of 2010, Public Employees for Environmental Responsibility filed a lawsuit against the National Park Service for not having taken measures to manage tortoise shooting in the Mojave National Preserve of California. Biologists discovered numerous gunshot wounds (holes) on dead tortoise shells which could likely have been caused long after natural death as these shells can take five years to disintegrate and make useful targets for well intentioned target shooters. These shells left behind by nature, droughts, roadkill, or vandals may have attracted ravens and threatened the healthy tortoises as any predator bird need only feed once on a small tortoise to remember it as a viable food source. The National Park Service did not take the measures they were urged to. They responded with "We simply do not believe that such regulations are warranted at this time." and no further action has been taken.

== Diseases ==
Reptiles are known to become infected by a wide range of pathogens, which includes viruses, bacteria, fungi, and parasites. More specifically, the G. agassizii population has been negatively affected by upper respiratory tract disease, cutaneous dyskeratosis, herpes virus, shell necrosis, urolithiasis (bladder stones), and parasites.

=== Upper respiratory tract disease ===
Upper respiratory tract disease (URTD) is a chronic, infectious disease responsible for population declines across the entire range of the desert tortoise. It was identified in the early 1970s in captive desert tortoise populations, and later identified in the wild population. URTD is caused by the infectious agents Mycoplasma agassizii and Mycoplasma testudineum, which are bacteria in the class Mollicutes and characterized by having no cell wall and a small genome.

Mycoplasmae appear to be highly virulent (infectious) in some populations, while chronic, or even dormant in others. The mechanism (whether environmental or genetic) responsible for this diversity is not understood. Infection is characterized by both physiological and behavioral changes: nasal and ocular discharge, palpebral edema (swelling of the upper and/or lower palpebra, or eyelid, the fleshy portion that is in contact with the tortoises eye globe) and conjunctivitis, weight loss, changes in color and elasticity of the integument, and lethargic or erratic behavior. These pathogens are likely transmitted by contact with an infected individual. Epidemiological studies of wild desert tortoises in the western Mojave Desert from 1992 to 1995 showed a 37% increase in M. agassizii. Tests were conducted on blood samples, and a positive test was determined by the presence of antibodies in the blood, defined as being seropositive.

=== Cutaneous dyskeratosis ===
Cutaneous dyskeratosis (CD) is a shell disease of unknown origin and has unknown implications on desert tortoise populations. Observationally, it is typified by shell lesions on the scutes. Areas infected with CD appear discolored, dry, rough and flakey, with peeling, pitting, and chipping through multiple cornified layers. Lesions are usually first located on the plastron (underside) of the tortoises, although lesions on the carapace (upper side) and fore limbs are not uncommon. In advanced cases, exposed areas become infected with bacteria, fungi, and exposed tissue and bone may become necrotic. CD was evident as early as 1979 and was initially identified on the Chuckwalla Bench Area of Critical Environmental Concern in Riverside County, California. Currently, the means of transmission are unknown, although hypotheses include autoimmune diseases, exposure to toxic chemicals (possibly from mines, or air pollution), or a deficiency disease (possibly resulting from tortoises consuming low-quality invasive plant species instead of high-nutrient native plants).

=== Impacts of disease ===
Two case studies outlined the spread of disease in desert tortoises. The Daggett Epidemiology of Upper Respiratory Tract Disease project, which provides supporting disease research for the Fort Irwin translocation project, lends an example of the spread of disease. In 2008, 197 health evaluations were conducted, revealing 25.0–45.2% exposure to M. agassizii and M. testudineum, respectively, in a core area adjacent to Interstate 15. The spread of disease was tracked over two years, and clinical signs of URTD spread from the core area to adjacent, outlying locations during this time. Overlaying home ranges and the social nature of these animals, suggests that disease-free individuals may be vulnerable to spread of disease, and that transmission can occur rapidly. Thus, wild tortoises that are close to the urban-wildlife interface may be vulnerable to spread of disease as a direct result of human influence.

The second study indicated that captive tortoises can be a source of disease to wild Agassiz's desert tortoise populations. Johnson et al. (2006) tested blood samples for URTD (n = 179) and herpesvirus (n = 109) from captive tortoises found near Barstow, California, and Hesperia, California. Demographic and health data were collected from the tortoises, as well from other reptiles housed in the same facility. Of these, 45.3% showed signs of mild disease, 16.2% of moderate disease, and 4.5% of severe disease, and blood tests revealed that 82.7% of tortoises had antibodies to mycoplasma, and 26.6% had antibodies to herpesvirus (which means the tortoises were seropositive for these two diseases, and indicate previous exposure to the causative agents). With an estimated 200,000 captive desert tortoises in California, their escape or release into the wild is a real threat to uninfected wild populations of tortoises. Projections from this study suggest that about 4400 tortoises could escape from captivity in a given year, and with an 82% exposure rate to URTD, the wild population may be at greater risk than previously thought.

== Domestic pets ==
Edwards et al. reported that 35% of desert tortoises in the Phoenix area are hybrids between either Gopherus agassizii and G. morafkai, or G. morafkai and the Texas tortoise, G. berlandieri. The intentional or accidental release of these tortoises could have dire consequences for wild tortoises.

Before obtaining a desert tortoise as a pet, it is best to check the laws and regulations of the local area and/or state. Desert tortoises may not be captured from the wild. They may, however, be given as a gift from one private owner to another. Desert tortoises need to be kept outdoors in a large area of dry soil and with access to vegetation and water. An underground den and a balanced diet are crucial to the health of captive tortoises.

=== Management activities and spread of disease ===
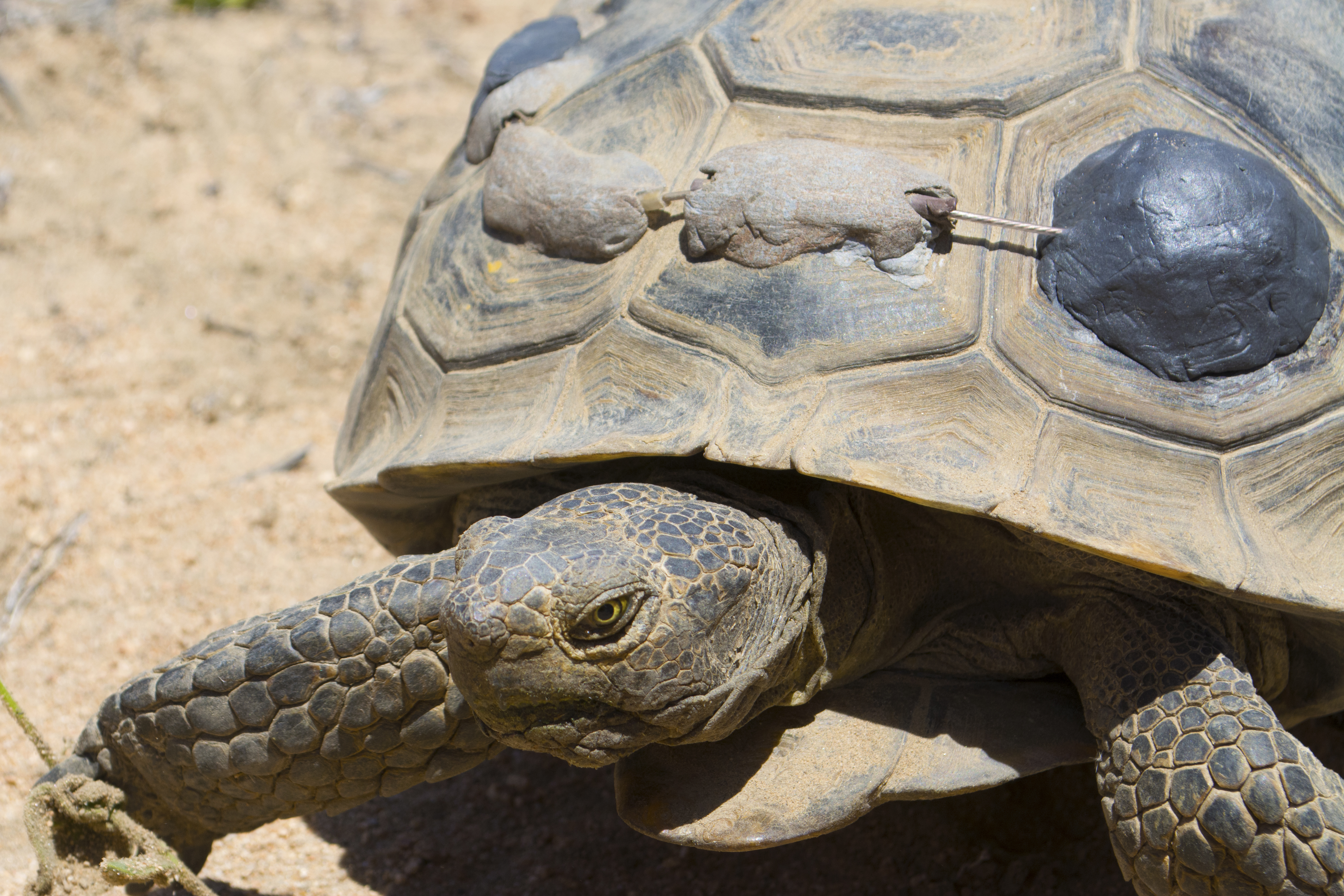
Tortoise Monitoring and Research at Joshua Tree National Park

==== Research ====
Wild populations of tortoises must be managed effectively to minimize the spread of diseases, which includes research and education. The 2011 USFWS Desert Tortoise recovery plan suggests that further research into Mycoplasma is needed to better understand its role in disease in Desert Tortoise populations. Recommendations are given for further research into populations of tortoises that are uninfected, those only recently infected, and those from endemically infected populations. Translocation of tortoises should be done with extreme caution; disease is typically furtive and moving individuals or populations of tortoises across a landscape can have unforeseen consequences.

==== Education ====
As a corollary to research, education may help prevent captive tortoises from coming into contact with wild populations. Education campaigns through veterinarians, government agencies, schools, museums, and community centers throughout the range of the desert tortoise could limit the spread of tortoise diseases into wild populations. Strategies may include encouraging people to not breed their captive tortoises, ensure that different species of turtles and tortoises are not housed in the same facility (which would help to prevent the spread of novel diseases into the desert tortoise population), ensure captive tortoises are adequately housed to prevent them from escaping into the wild, and to ensure that captive turtles and tortoises are never released into the wild.

Desert tortoises have been severely affected by disease. Both upper respiratory tract disease and cutaneous dyskeratosis have caused precipitous population declines and die-offs across the entire range of this charismatic species. Both of these diseases are extremely likely to be caused by people, and URTD is easily linked with people releasing captive tortoises into the wild. The combination of scientific research and public education is imperative to curb the spread of disease and aid the tortoise in recovery.

== State reptile ==
The desert tortoise is the state reptile of California and Nevada.

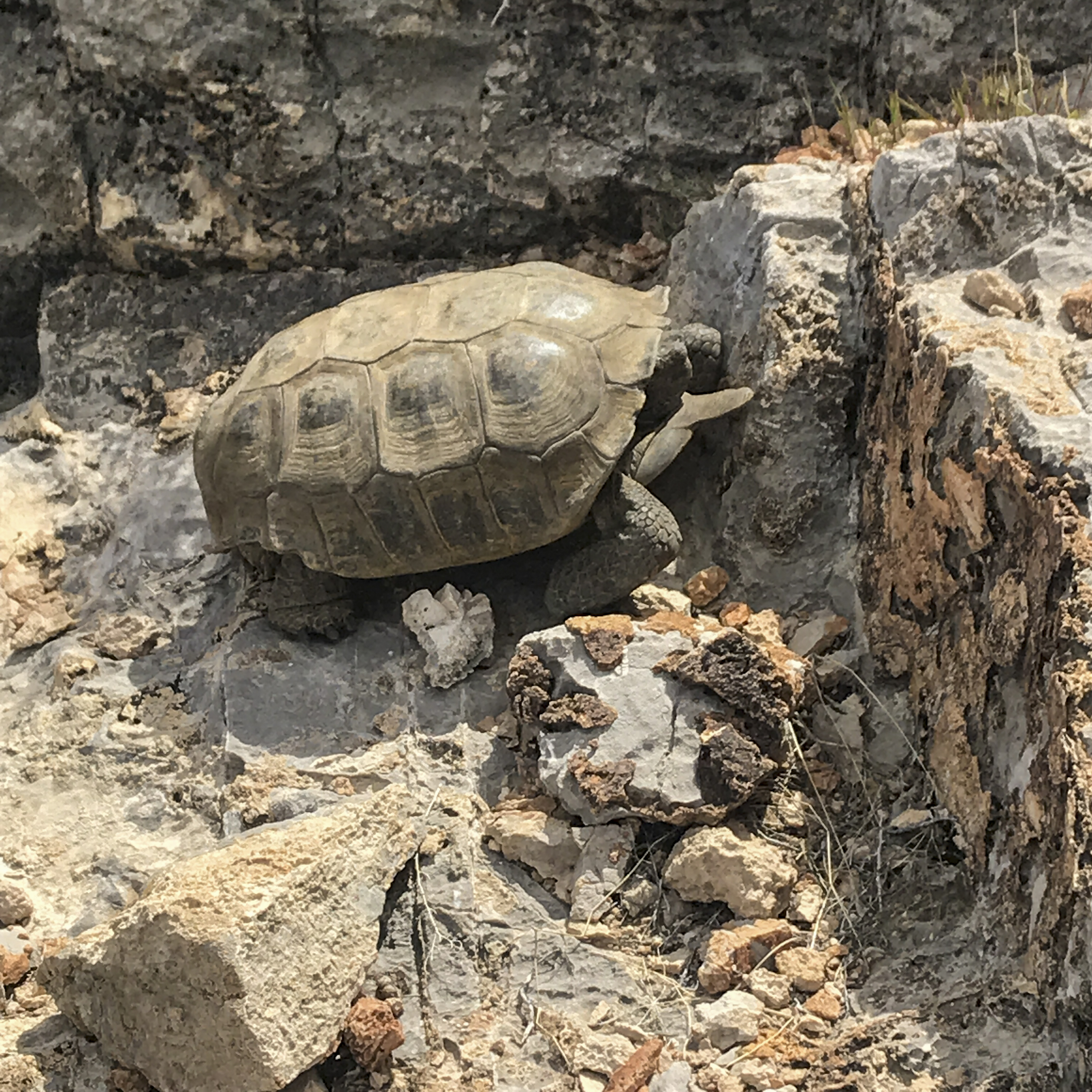
Closeup of desert tortoise at Red Rock Canyon National Conservation Area, 2020

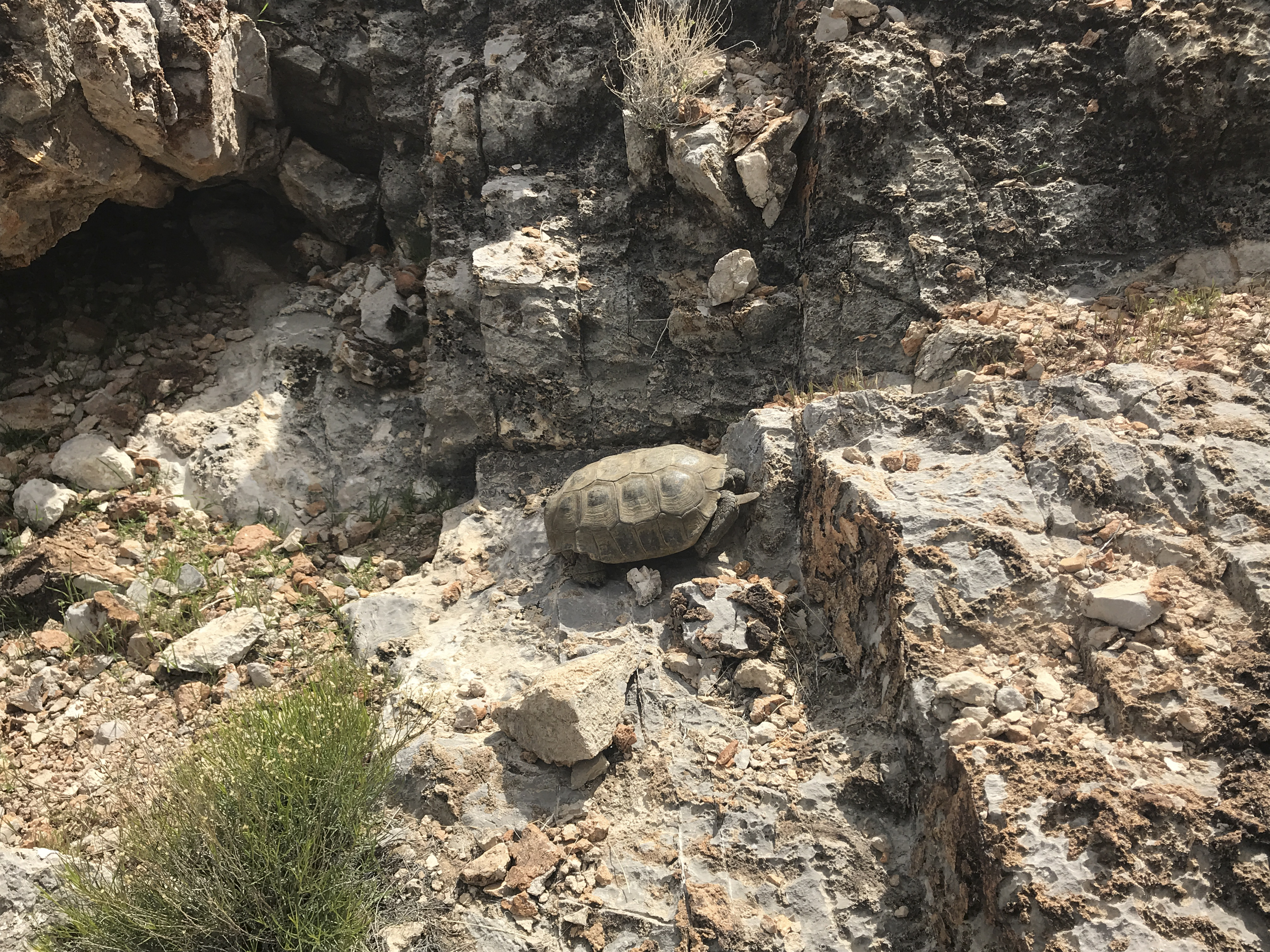
Same desert tortoise at Red Rock Canyon NCA showing habitat, 2020

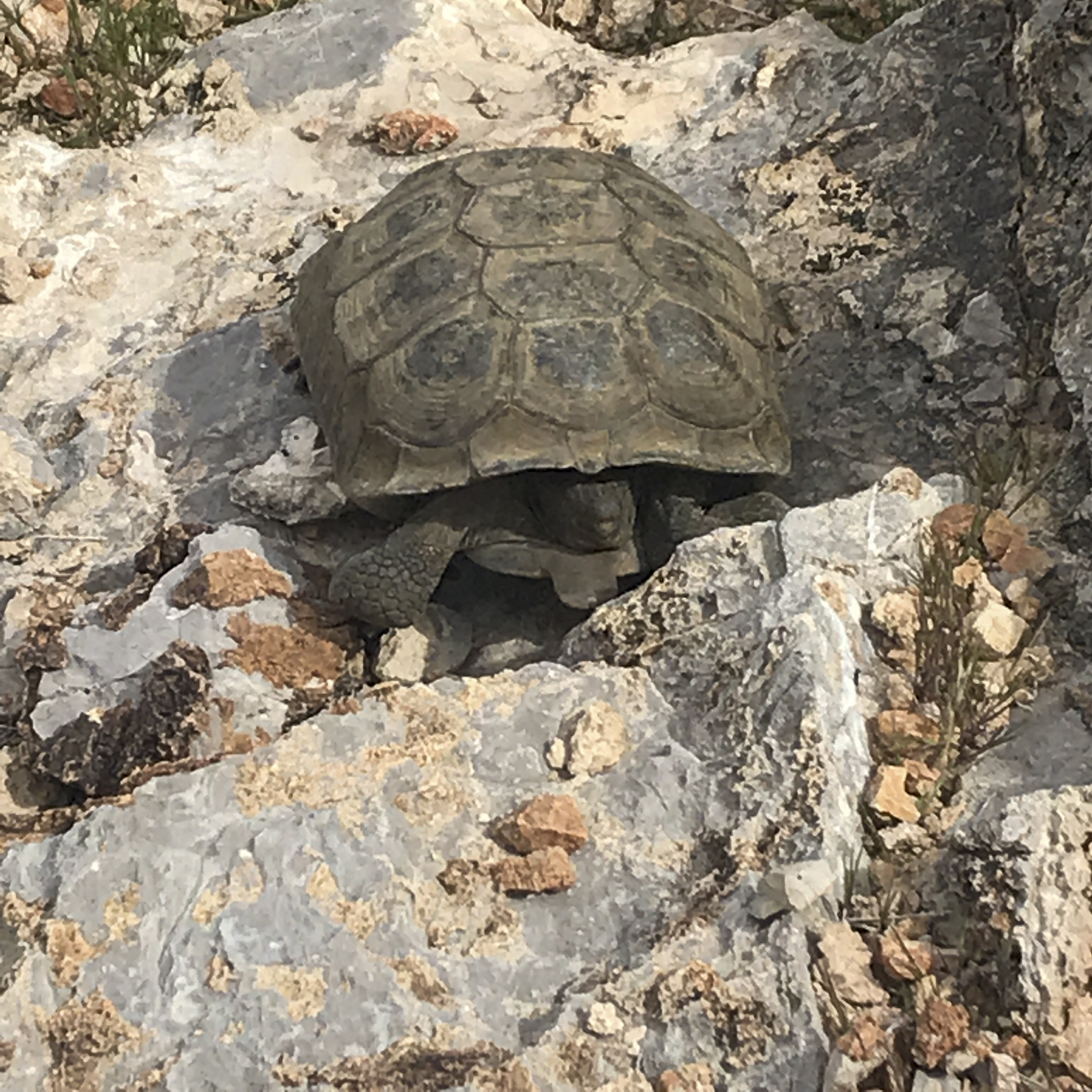
Front view closeup of desert tortoise at Red Rock Canyon NCA, 2020

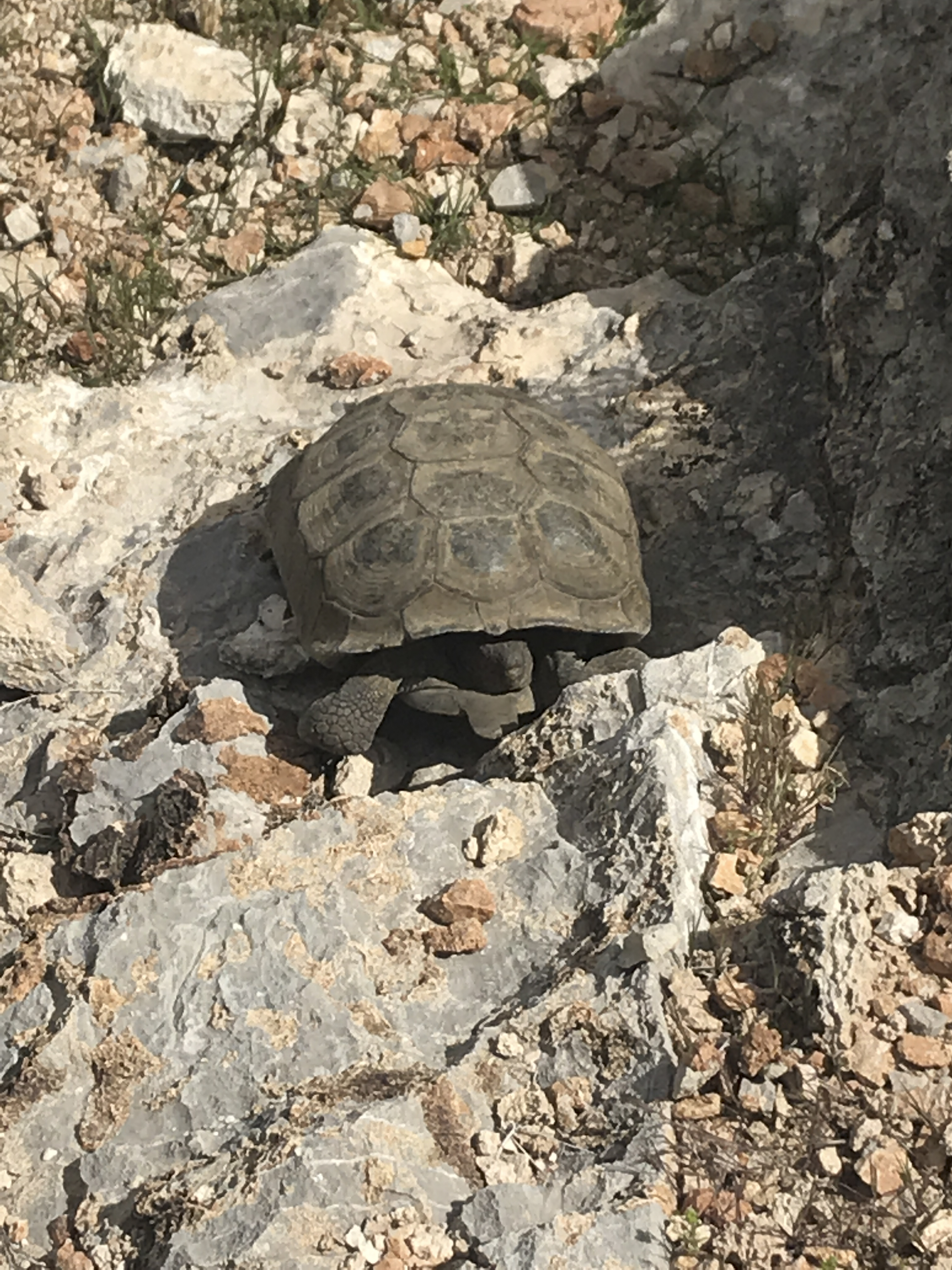
Photo showing rocky habitat of desert tortoise at Red Rock Canyon NCA, 2020
