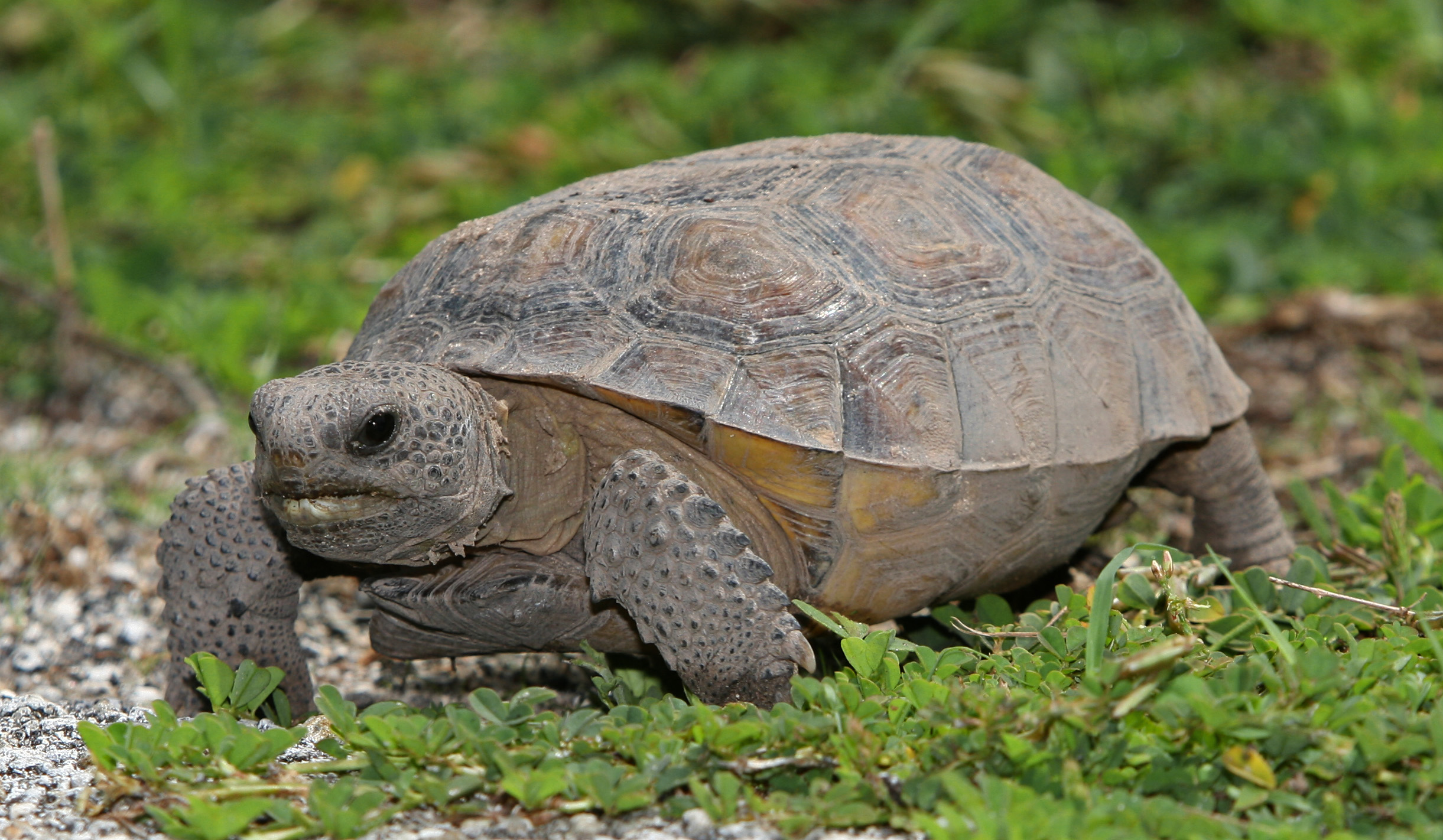
- Gopher tortoise, Gopherus polyphemus

Scientific classification
- Kingdom: Animalia
- Phylum: Chordata
- Class: Reptilia
- Order: Testudines
- Suborder: Cryptodira
- Family: Testudinidae
- Genus: Gopherus; Rafinesque, 1832

Species
- Gopherus agassizii (Cooper, 1863); Gopherus berlandieri (Agassiz, 1857); Gopherus evgoodei Edwards et al., 2016; Gopherus flavomarginatus Legler, 1959; Gopherus morafkai Murphy et al., 2011; Gopherus polyphemus (Daudin, 1802)
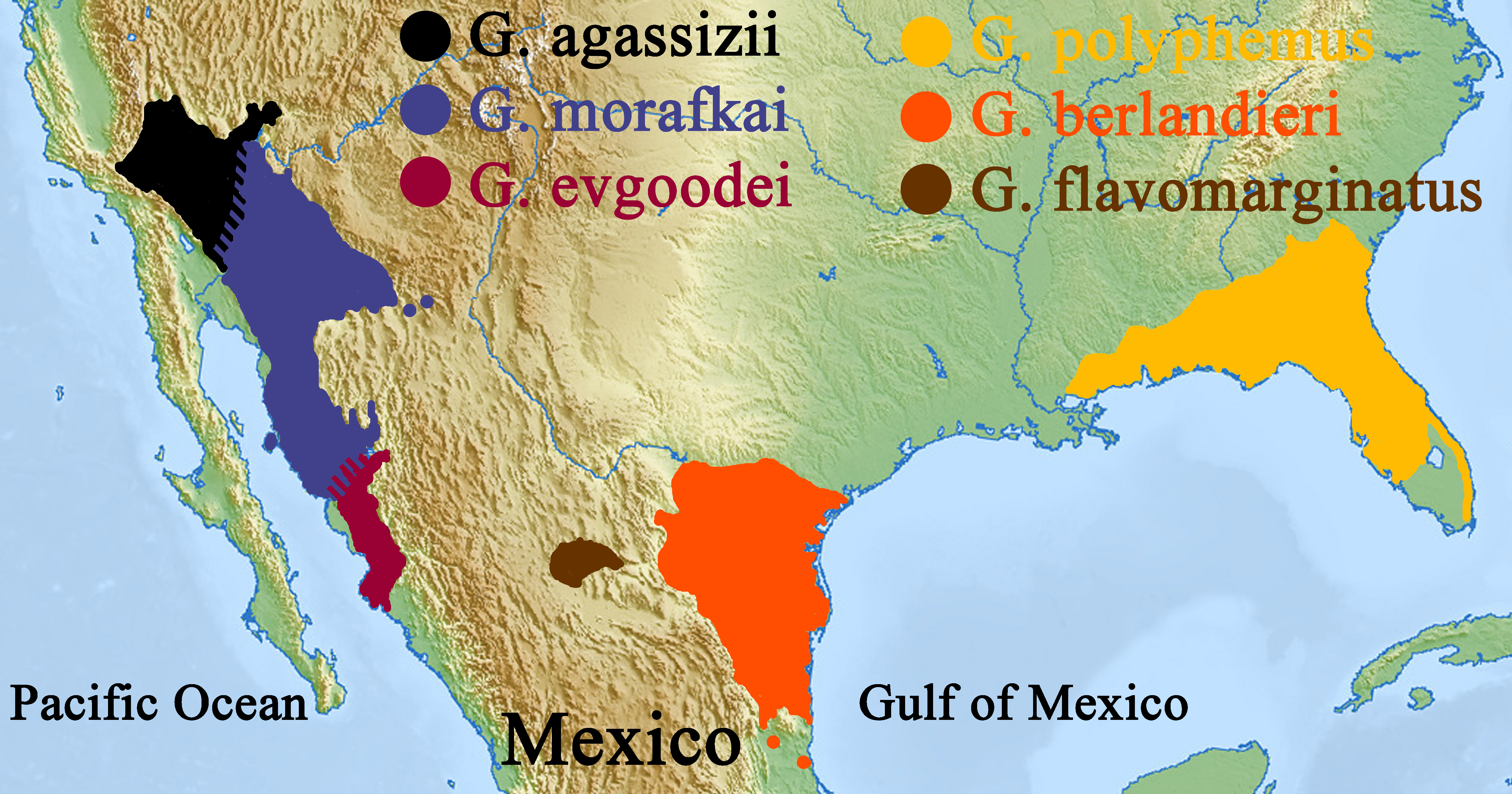
- Distribution of the genus Gopherus

= Gopherus =

Gopherus Temporal range: Priabonian–Recent

Genus of tortoises

Gopherus is a genus of fossorial tortoises commonly referred to as gopher tortoises. The gopher tortoise is grouped with land tortoises that originated 60 million years ago, in North America. A genetic study has shown that their closest relatives are in the Asian genus Manouria. The gopher tortoises live in the southern United States from California's Mojave Desert across to Florida, and in parts of northern Mexico. Gopher tortoises are so named because of some species' habit of digging large, deep burrows (gophers are small terrestrial burrowing rodents). Most notably, Gopherus polyphemus digs burrows which can be up to 40 feet (12 m) in length and 10 feet (3.0 m) in depth. These burrows are used by a variety of other species, including mammals, other reptiles, amphibians, and birds. Gopher tortoises are 20–50 cm (7.9–19.7 in) in length, depending on the species. All six species are found in xeric habitats. Numerous extinct species are known, the oldest dating to the Priabonian stage of the Late Eocene of the United States.

== Species ==
In July 2011, researchers decided on the basis of DNA, and morphological and behavioral data that the Sonoran and Mojave populations of the desert tortoise, G. agassizii were distinct species. This newly described species was named G. morafkai, or the Morafka's desert tortoise. The acceptance of G. morafkai reduced the range of G. agassizii by about 70% In 2016, based on a large-scale genetic analysis, ecological and morphological data, researchers proposed a split between the Sonoran and Sinaloan populations. This southernmost member of the Gopherus genus was named G. evgoodei. As such, there are currently six recognized extant species in the genus Gopherus:

=== Extant ===
Listed alphabetically by binomial name:

Image	Common name	Scientific name	Distribution
	Mojave desert tortoise	Gopherus agassizii (Cooper, 1863)	Endemic to USA. Mojave Desert in southeastern California, southern Nevada, and extreme southwestern Utah and northwest Arizona, north and west of the Colorado River.
	Texas tortoise	Gopherus berlandieri (Agassiz, 1857)	Tamaulipan mezquital ecoregion of south Texas, USA, eastern Coahuila, northern Nuevo León, and Tamaulipas, Mexico with a few old records (questionable) from southern San Luis Potosí.
	Goode's thornscrub tortoise	Gopherus evgoodei Edwards et al., 2016	Endemic to Mexico. Tropical deciduous forest and thornscrub in southern Sonora and adjacent areas of extreme northern Sinaloa and extreme southwestern Chihuahua.
	Bolson tortoise	Gopherus flavomarginatus Legler, 1959	Endemic to Mexico. Chihuahua Desert of North-central Mexico, in the vicinity of the conjunction of the Chihuahua, Coahuila, and Durango state borders.
	Sonoran desert tortoise	Gopherus morafkai Murphy et al., 2011	Sonora Desert in northern Sonora, including Tiburon Island, Mexico and southwest Arizona, south and east of the Colorado River.
	Gopher tortoise	Gopherus polyphemus (Daudin, 1802)	Endemic to USA. Extreme eastern Louisiana, southern Mississippi, southern Alabama, southern Georgia, Florida, and extreme southeastern South Carolina.

=== Fossil ===
Members of Gopherus that became extinct in the late Pleistocene:

- †Gopherus donlaloi (Reynoso and Montellano-Ballesteros, 2004)
- †Gopherus depressus
- †Gopherus hexagonatus (Cope, 1893) Late Pliocene-Late Pleistocene, large sized species, with carapaces over a metre (3.3 ft) in length.

== Breeding ==
Gopher tortoises usually mate during April and May. The female will then choose either a sunny spot nearby or a sandy mound in front of her burrow to lay between 3 and 15 eggs. The eggs then hatch from 70 to 100 days later. Once hatched, the baby tortoises spend most of their time in their mother's burrow until they learn to dig their own burrow. They do not reach maturity until they are around 10 to 15 years old. Gopher tortoises have an abbreviated mating season in early spring, when male tortoises visit the female tortoise' burrows and mate with them.

== Diet ==
Gopher tortoises are mainly herbivores that feed on low growing plant life. Their diet consists mostly of grasses and legumes but they will also feed on small berries and fruits.

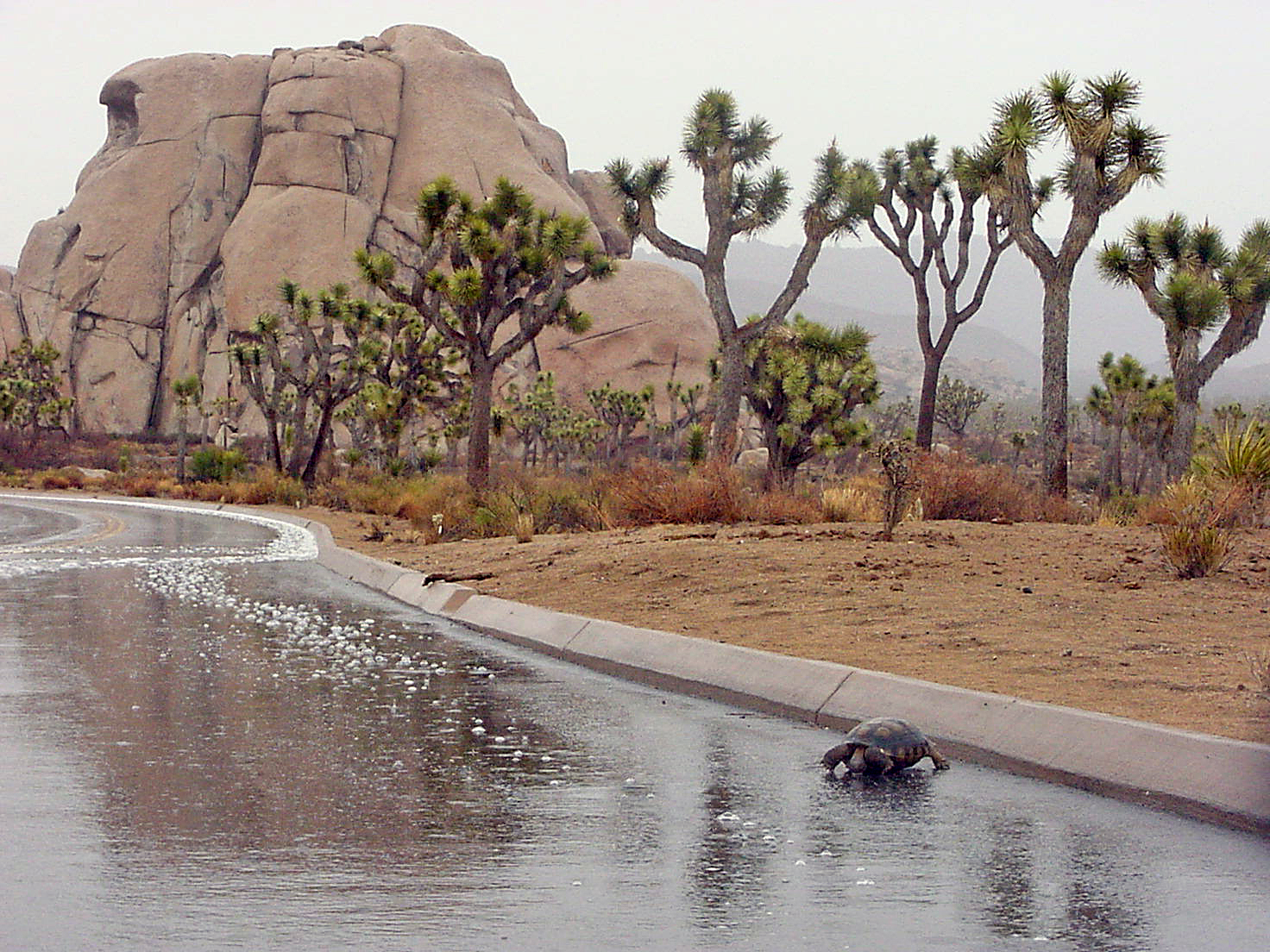
Desert tortoise (Gopherus agassizii) drinking from roadway in Joshua Tree National Park

The diet of tortoises contain excess salt, sodium, chloride, and potassium that must be purged from the body, and drinking free standing water, even if only once or a few times each year, is essential for this function and for tortoise survival. Opportunities for gopher tortoises to drink water vary greatly between the species in the genus. Gopherus agassizii live in extremely arid areas that can receive as little as 10–20 cm. per year. Gopherus polyphemus live in mesic habitat, where water is available and evaporative loss is less problematic. Other species live in intermediate environments where a few weeks of rain typically occur twice per year, or where relatively consistent summer rains occur. When pools of rain water or saturated soils are available tortoises will direct their heads face down and submerge their face to a level just below the eyes and drink copiously. Reptiles modify urine and plasma concentrations in their bodies with their bladder, cloaca, and colon, rather than the kidneys. The bladder plays a major function in regulating blood osmolality: permeable to ammonia, urea, water, and small ions, but not uric acid. This permeability allows tortoises that are hibernating, or living in arid environments without drinking water for months at a time to store uric acid, but resorb water from the bladder. Tortoises react to dry periods by retreating to shelters (burrows, caves etc.) with more humid microhabitats, and remaining inactive. Gopher tortoises can survive a year of drought through both behavior and physiological adaptations, two years of drought can result in deteriorating body conditions, and extended years of drought will produce high mortalities of gopher tortoises.

There are many observations of Gopherus eating non-vegetation food items. Documented examples include a variety of bones, snail shells, soil at mineral licks, charcoal, sand, stones, human trash, carrion, raptor pellets and various animals feces. Gopherus polyphemus studies observed specimens moving bones into their burrows and found the fourth most common matter in their scats was insect material. The exact reasons are not entirely understood, some cases might simply be due to accidentally ingesting materials near food items or sampling potential foods. Hypotheses concerning the consumption of animal matter by Gopherus include supplements for the low levels of calcium, phosphorus, or protein in their diet, and a need for calcium carbonate in bones, the production of eggshells in females, and growing young. Hypotheses on the consumption of nonfood items such as soil or rocks include mastication or vermifuge for the removal of parasites.

== Conservation ==
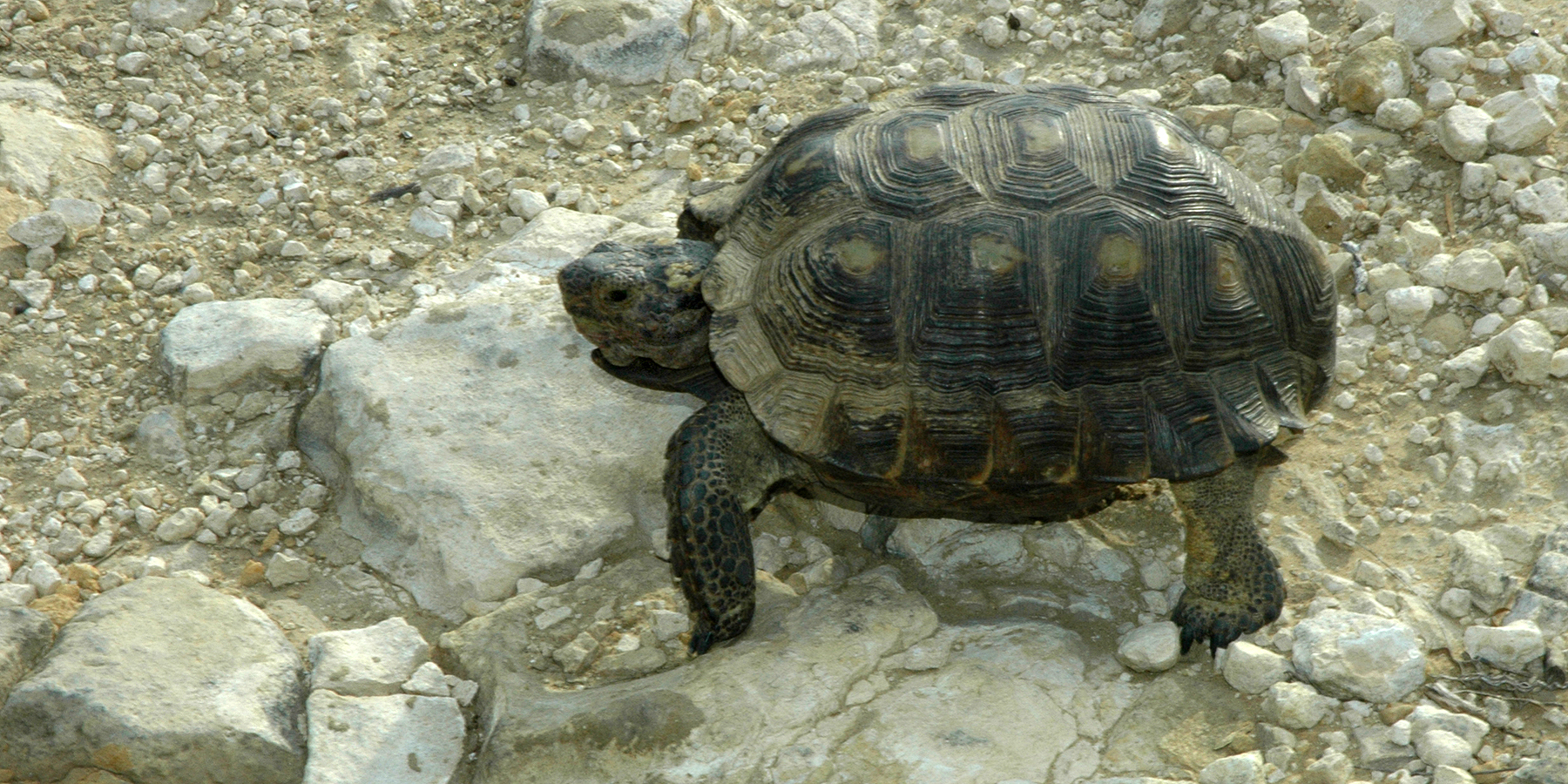
Texas tortoise (Gopherus berlandieri), northern Tamaulipas, Mexico

Populations of all six species of Gopherus have declined dramatically. In the past, gopher tortoises were hunted for their meat, which was used in stews. Currently the most significant threat to their survival is habitat destruction, but the pet trade and collisions with vehicles have also taken their toll. To help decrease gopher tortoise death due to collisions with vehicles, the US Department of Transportation in Mississippi has recently placed angled fences along the road side to keep tortoise from wandering onto the highways near their habitats. On November 9, 2009, the US Fish and Wildlife Service proposed rulemaking to include the eastern population of the gopher tortoise, Gopherus polyphemus, in the List of Threatened Wildlife. In 2018, the IUCN Tortoise and Freshwater Turtle Specialist Group recommended a re-assessment and re-classification of all six Gopherus species This reclassification would move G. agassizii from Vulnerable (VU) to Critically Endangered (CR), G. berlandieri from Near Endangered (NE) to Near Threatened (NT), G. evgoodei from Near Endangered (NE) to Vulnerable (VU), G. flavomarginatus from Vulnerable (VU) to Critically Endangered (CR), G. morafkai from Near Endangered (NE) to Vulnerable (VU) and G. polyphemus from Vulnerable (VU) to Endangered (EN).

== Gallery ==
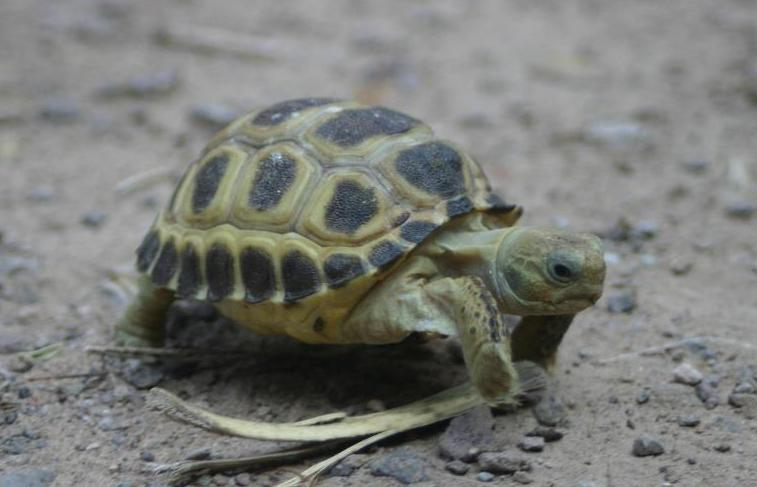
A juvenile bolson tortoise (Gopherus flavomarginatus), from Durango, Mexico (7 July 2006)

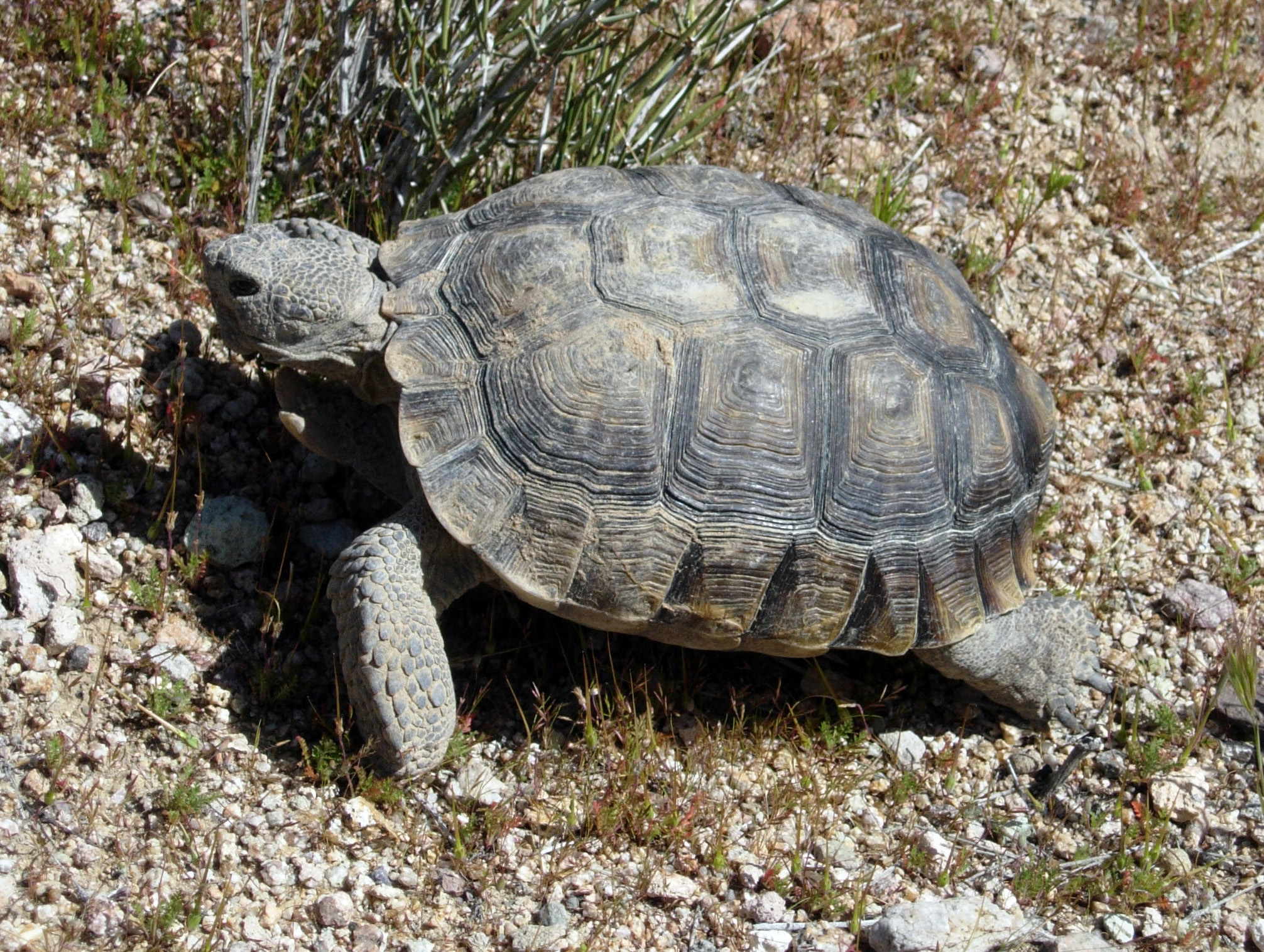
Desert tortoise (Gopherus agassizii) San Bernardino County, California, US.

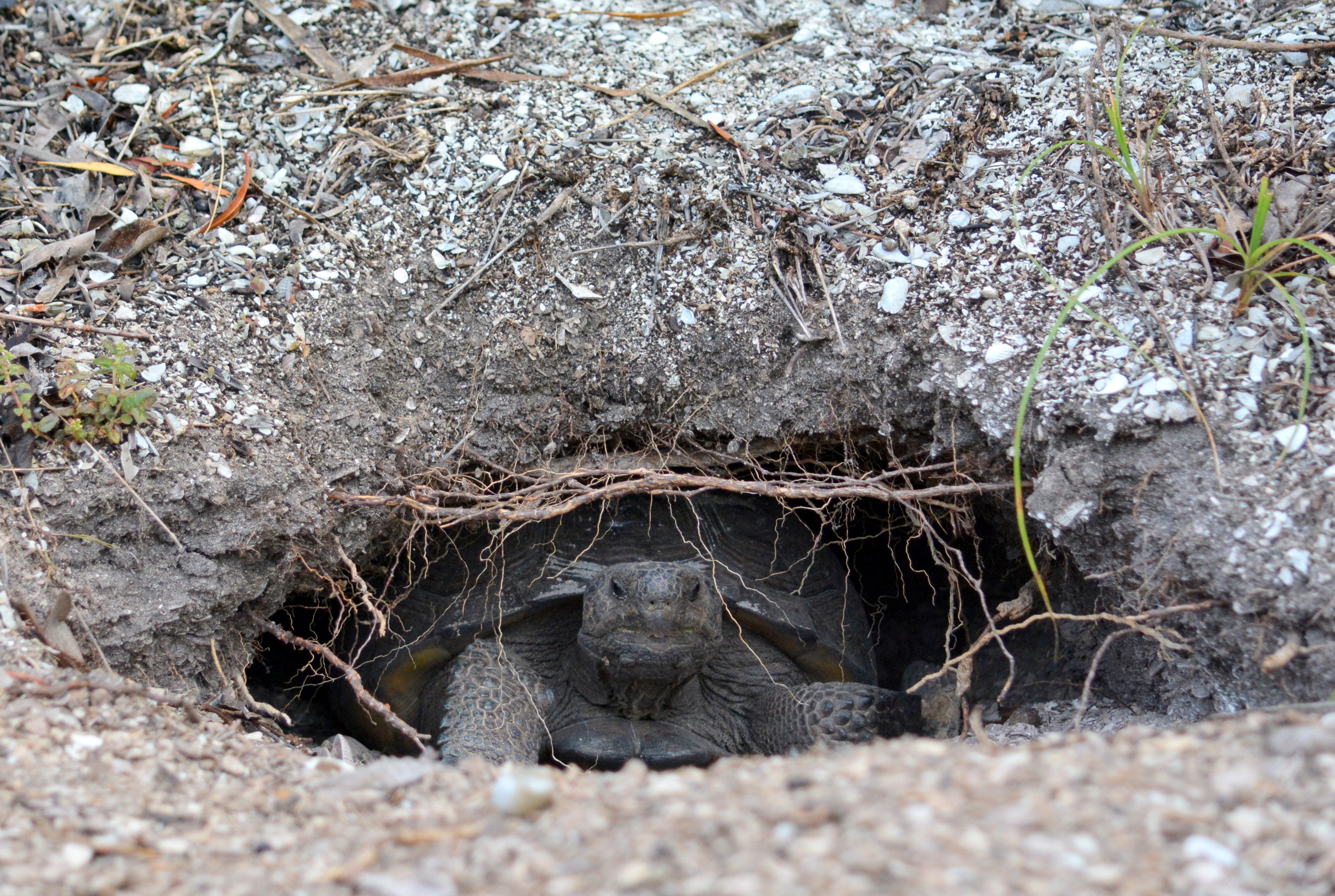
Gopher tortoise (Gopherus polyphemus) from Lee County, Florida (18 June 2018)

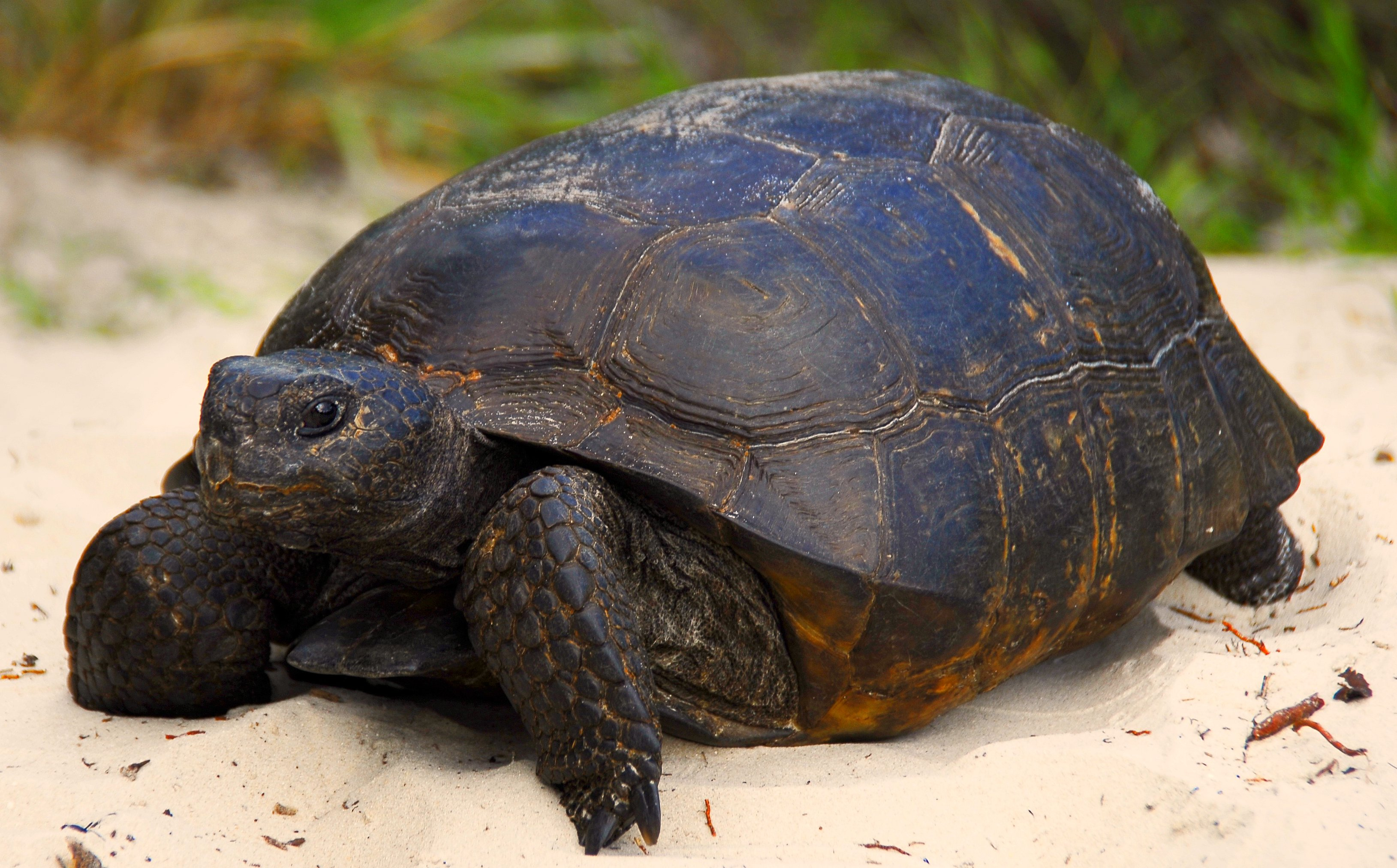
Gopher tortoise (Gopherus polyphemus) from Volusia County, Florida (14 September 2008)
