= Mycoplasma agassizii =

Scientific classification
- Domain: Bacteria
- Kingdom: Bacillati
- Phylum: Mycoplasmatota
- Class: Mollicutes
- Order: Mycoplasmatales
- Family: Mycoplasmataceae
- Genus: Mycoplasma
- Species: M. agassizii

Binomial name
- Mycoplasma agassizii Brown et al. 2001

Species of bacterium

Mycoplasma agassizii is a species of bacteria in the genus Mycoplasma. This genus of bacteria lacks a cell wall around their cell membrane. Without a cell wall, they are unaffected by many common antibiotics such as penicillin or other beta-lactam antibiotics that target cell wall synthesis. Mycoplasma are the smallest bacterial cells yet discovered, can survive without oxygen and are typically about 0.1 μm in diameter.

Cultures are available from the Mollicutes Culture Collection (Curators Dr. J.K. Davis and M.K. Davidson, University of Florida). This mycoplasma species was originally isolated from a species of desert tortoise Gopherus agassizii which was named for by Louis Agassiz.

Since its discovery, it has been recovered from other species of tortoises:

- Geochelone chilensis or Chaco tortoise
- Geochelone pardalis or Leopard tortoise
- Geochelone elegans or Indian star tortoise
- Geochelone forstenii or Travancore tortoise
- Geochelone sulcate or African spurred tortoise
- Gopherus agassizii or desert tortoise
- Gopherus polyphemus or Gopher tortoise
- Indotestudo species
- Terrapene carolina bauri or Florida box turtle
- Testudo graeca graeca or Spur-thighed tortoise
- Testudo graeca ibera or Spur-thighed tortoise

The type strain is PS6 = ATCC 700616 = CCUG 53180 and available from the Mollicutes Culture Collection, University of Florida.
