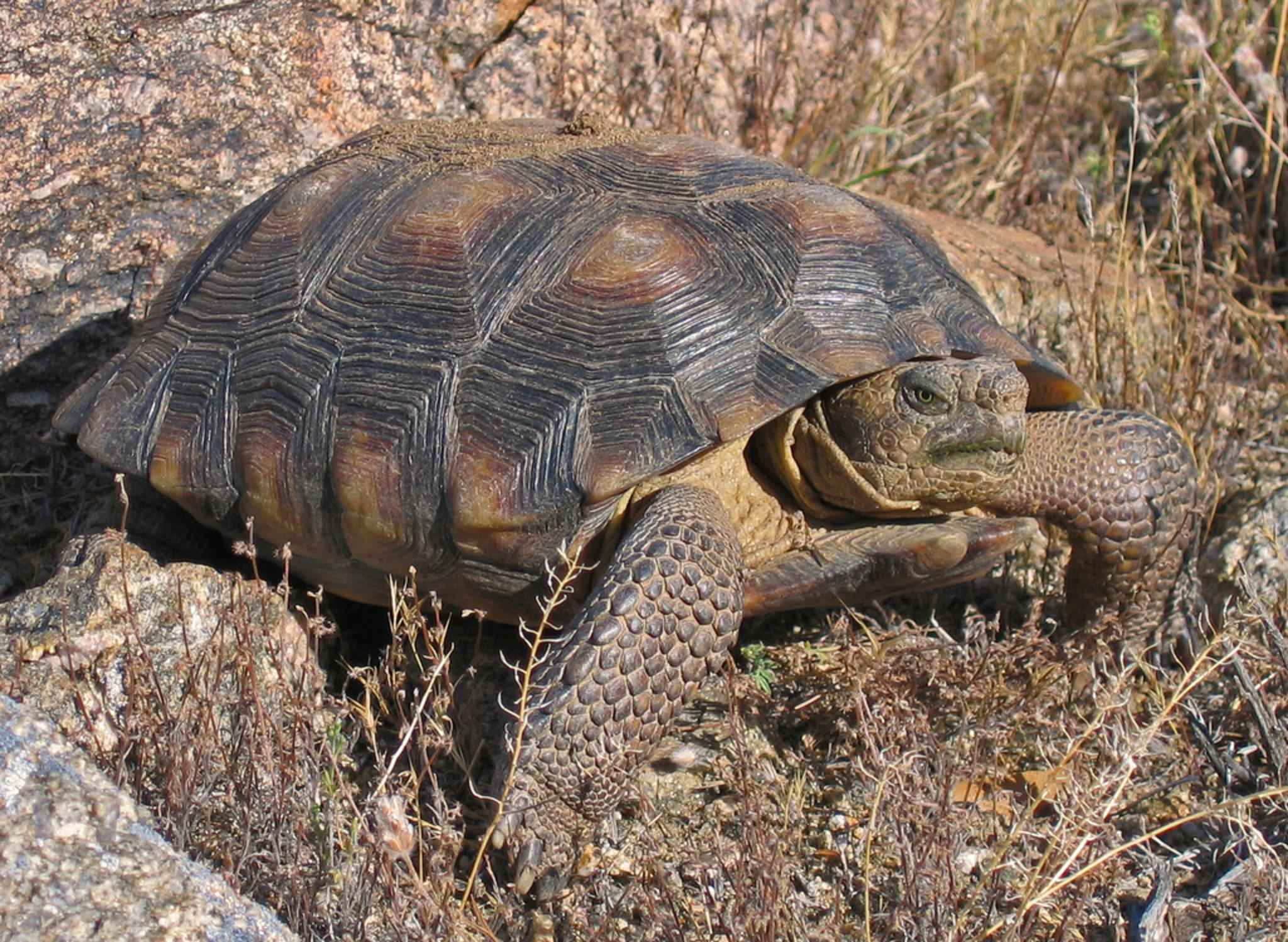
- Sonoran Desert tortoise, G. morafkai

Conservation status
- Vulnerable (IUCN 3.1)

Scientific classification
- Kingdom: Animalia
- Phylum: Chordata
- Class: Reptilia
- Order: Testudines
- Suborder: Cryptodira
- Family: Testudinidae
- Genus: Gopherus
- Species: G. morafkai

Binomial name
- Gopherus morafkai Murphy, Berry, Edwards, Leviton, Lathrop, and Riedle, 2011

= Sonoran Desert tortoise =

Species of tortoise

The Sonoran Desert tortoise (Gopherus morafkai), or Morafka's desert tortoise, is a species of terrestrial chelonian reptile of the family Testudinidae (tortoises) native to the Sonoran Desert.

== Taxon history ==
In 2011, using DNA evidence, geography, and behavioral observations, it was concluded that two distinct species of desert tortoise exist on either side (east-west) of the Colorado River:

- the Mojave or Agassiz's desert tortoise (Gopherus agassizii); known primarily from the California counties of Imperial, Inyo, Kern, Los Angeles, Riverside, San Bernardino, and San Diego. Its range continues northeast of Death Valley and the Mojave Desert through the Nevada counties of Clark, Esmeralda, Lincoln and Nye, as well as Mohave County, in Arizona, and extreme southwestern Utah, near Zion National Park.
- the Sonoran or Morafka's desert tortoise (Gopherus morafkai); found east of the Colorado River, primarily in the Arizona counties of Cochise, Gila, Graham, La Paz, Maricopa, Mohave, Pima, Pinal, Santa Cruz, Yavapai and Yuma. Found in the Sonoran Desert, in the states of Sonora and Sinaloa, Mexico. The new species' name is in honor of the late Professor David Joseph Morafka of California State University, Dominguez Hills, in recognition of his many contributions to the study and conservation of the genus Gopherus.
