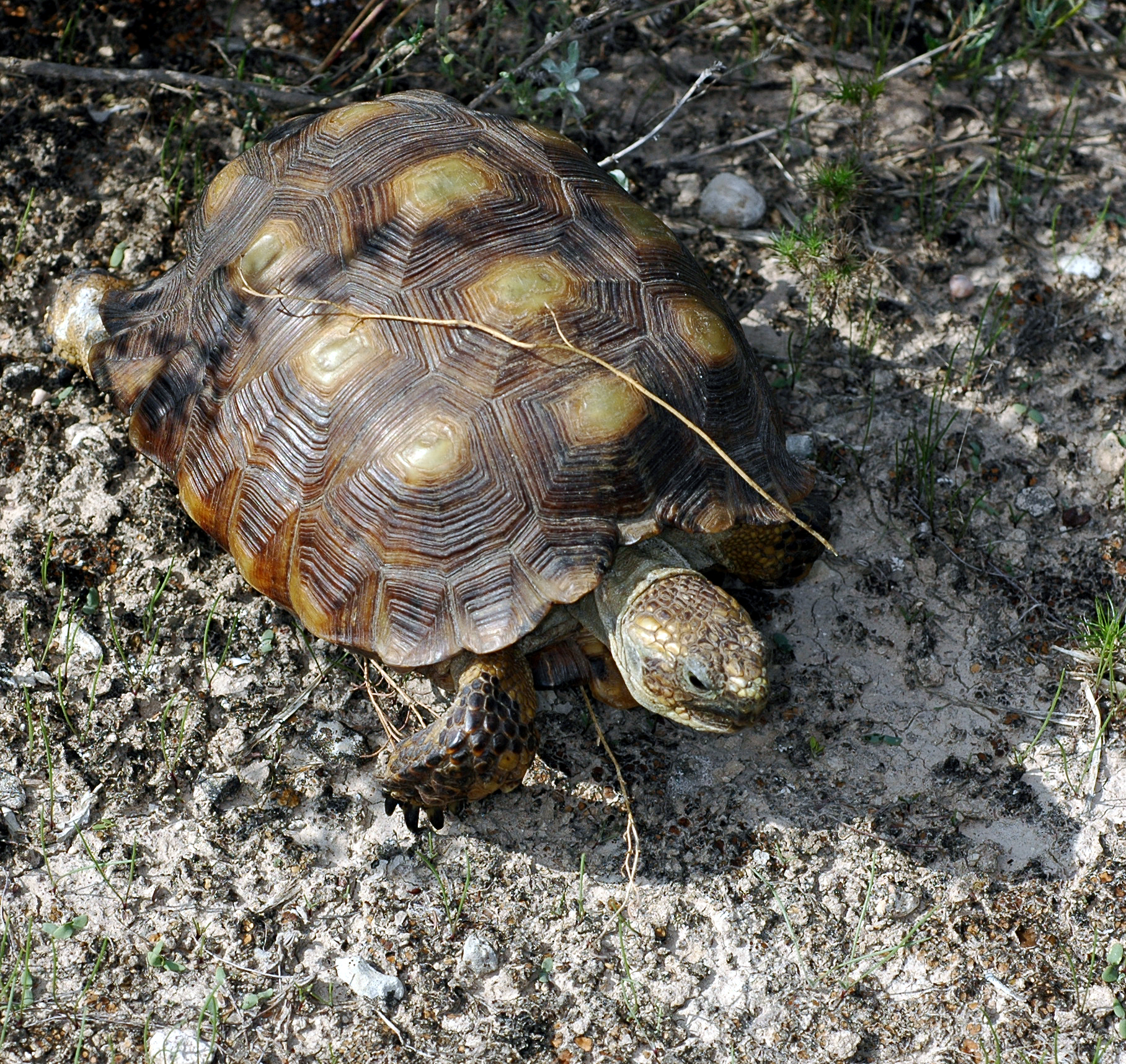

Conservation status
- Least Concern (IUCN 2.3)
- CITES Appendix II

Scientific classification
- Kingdom: Animalia
- Phylum: Chordata
- Class: Reptilia
- Order: Testudines
- Suborder: Cryptodira
- Family: Testudinidae
- Genus: Gopherus
- Species: G. berlandieri

Binomial name
- Gopherus berlandieri (Agassiz, 1857)

Synonyms
- Xerobates berlandieri Agassiz, 1857; Testudo berlandieri — Strauch, 1862; Xerobates gopher berlandieri — Gray, 1873; Testudo tuberculata Berlandier, 1882 (nomen nudum); Gopherus berlandieri — Stejneger, 1893; Gopherus polyphemus berlandieri — Mertens & Wermuth, 1955; Gopherus berlandierii [sic] Reeves, 1975 (ex errore); Scaptochelys berlandieri — Bramble, 1982; Gopherus berlanderi [sic] Rogner, 1996 (ex errore)

= Texas tortoise =

Species of tortoise

The Texas tortoise (Gopherus berlandieri) is a species of tortoise in the family Testudinidae. The species G. berlandieri is one of six species of tortoises that are native to North America.

== Geographic range ==
G. berlandieri (Texas Tortoise) is found in the southern third of Texas (roughly parallel to Houston) southward into the Mexican states of Coahuila, Nuevo León, and Tamaulipas. Within its range, it inhabits semi-arid regions characterized by mesquite shrub and cactus dominated landscapes.

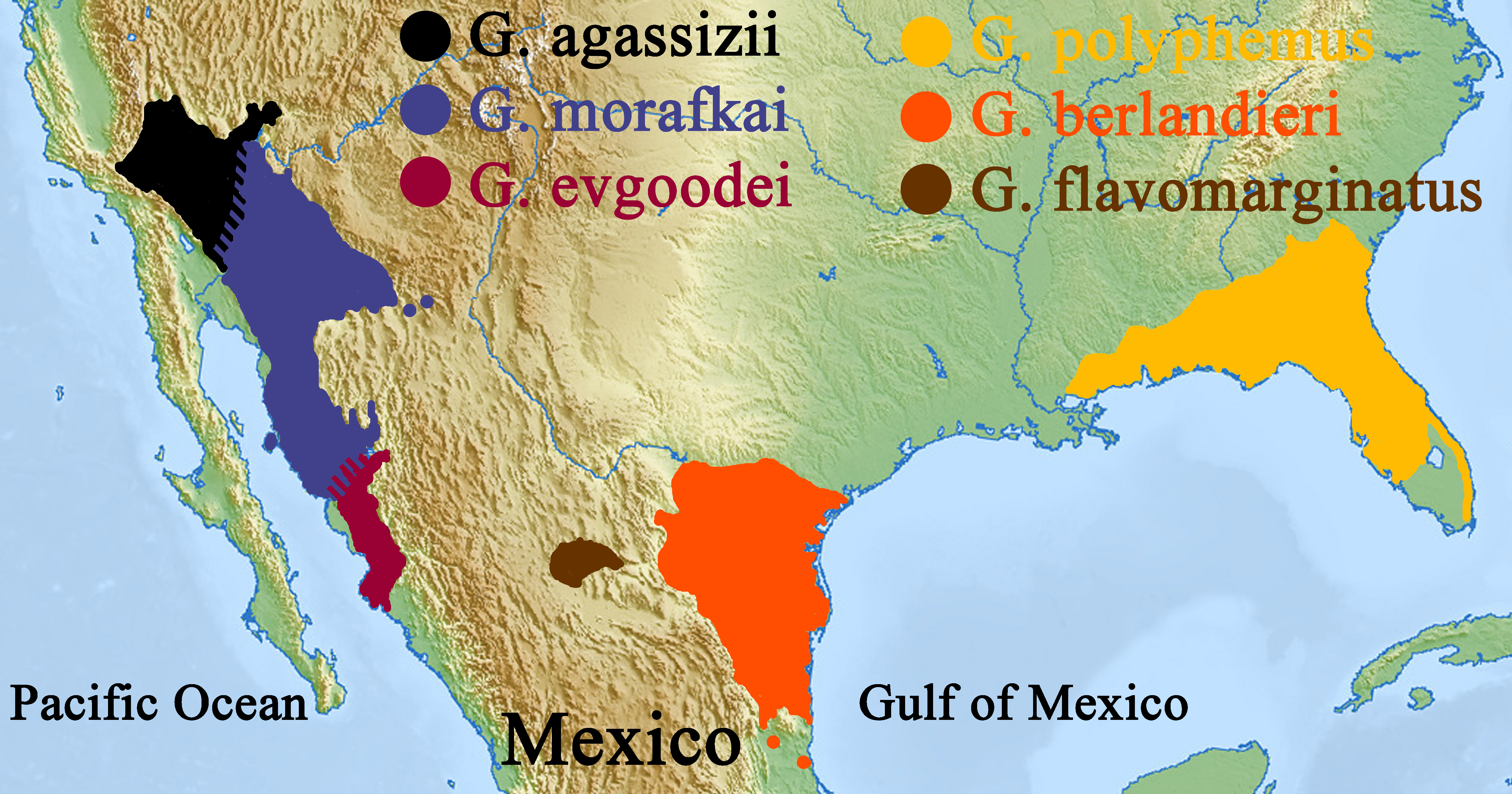

== Etymology ==
The specific epithet, berlandieri, is in honor of naturalist Jean Louis Berlandier, who worked for the Mexican government on one of the first biological surveys of Texas. As such, some sources refer to it as Berlandier's tortoise.

== Biology ==
The Texas tortoise, unlike other species of gopher tortoise, is not an adept burrower. It uses the thick vegetation for cover and thermoregulation. Succulent plants, a preferred food of the Texas tortoise, are common in these areas. It especially likes the fruit of cacti such as the prickly pear. The Texas Tortoise is oviparous. Female clutch sizes typically range anywhere from 1 to 5 eggs. The success of these clutches dramatically rely climatic conditions and habitat quality. A major ecological role Texas Tortoises play is in the dispersal of seeds throughout its range. By consuming fruit and excreting its seeds, the Texas Tortoise plays a pivotal role in the structure of the plant community that the tortoise inhabits. Study on this species population genetics suggest limited gene flow and potential regional isolation. Population studies using mark-recapture methods have shown low dispersal rate and a somewhat limited contiguous home range. The Texas Tortoise is threatened by fragmentation, habitat loss, and illegal collection/trade.

== Conservation status ==
Texas tortoises used to be very common, with densities of around 15–16 tortoises/ha, which were recorded in 1975. By 2001 the number of tortoises has drastically declined to an estimated 0.26 tortoises/ha and their distribution has become sporadic.

The Texas tortoise is still considered an animal of low concern by the IUCN Red List, where it has not been evaluated since 1996 though. It is listed as a threatened species in the state of Texas, and thus protected by state law. It is illegal to collect or possess them. The Mexican federal government lists Gopherus berlandieri as A (= Threatened) in Mexico. Likewise, using Environmental Vulnerability Scores, Gopherus berlandieri scored 18, a high vulnerability species on a scale of 0–20, in evaluations of both Tamaulipas and Nuevo Leon herpetofauna. In 2018, the IUCN Tortoise and Freshwater Turtle Specialist Group recommended a re-assessment and re-classification of all six Gopherus species. This reclassification would move G. berlandieri from Near Endangered (NE) to Near Threatened (NT).

== Gallery ==
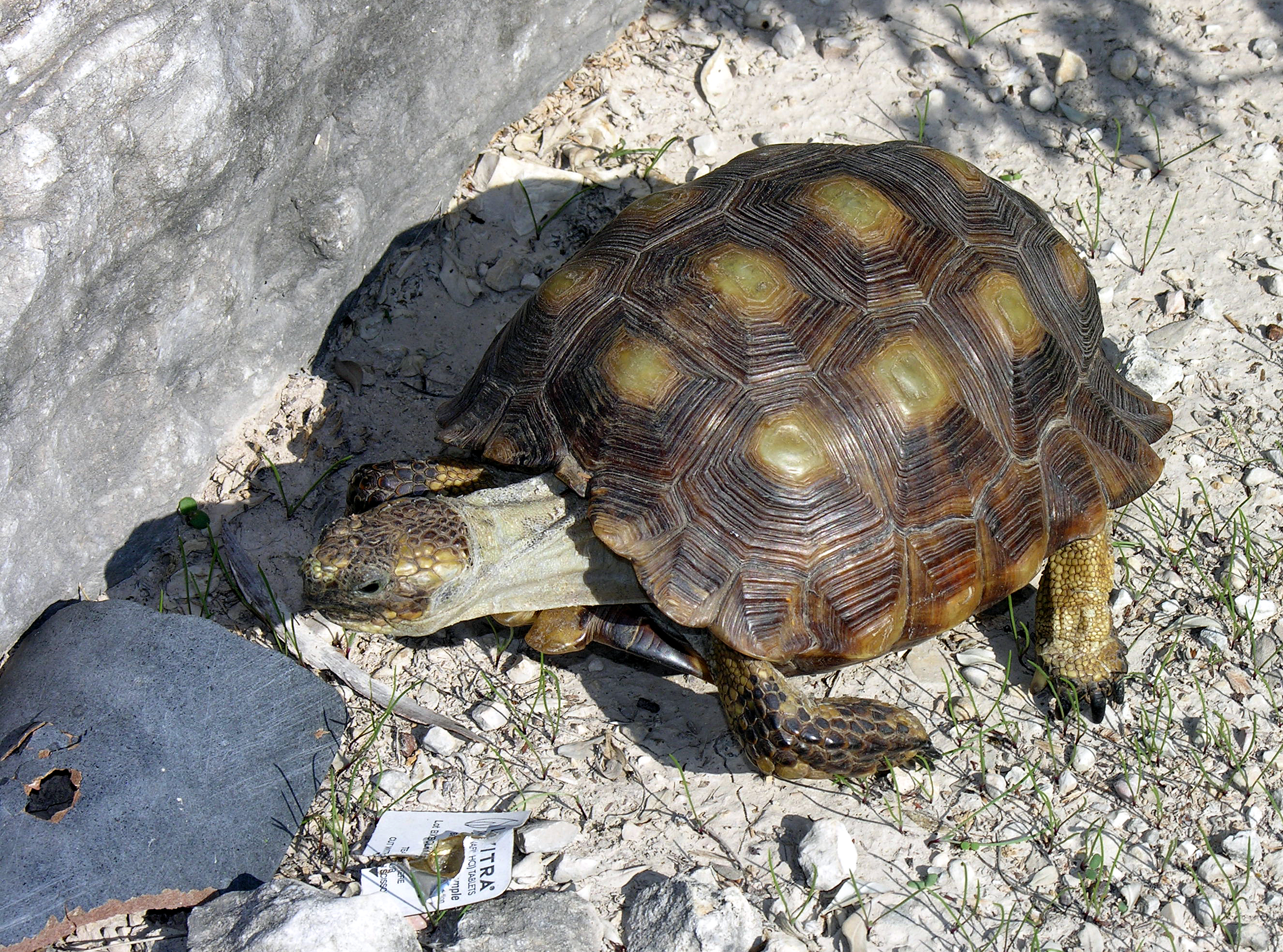
Texas tortoise (Gopherus berlandieri), Val Verde Co, Texas, USA (2005).

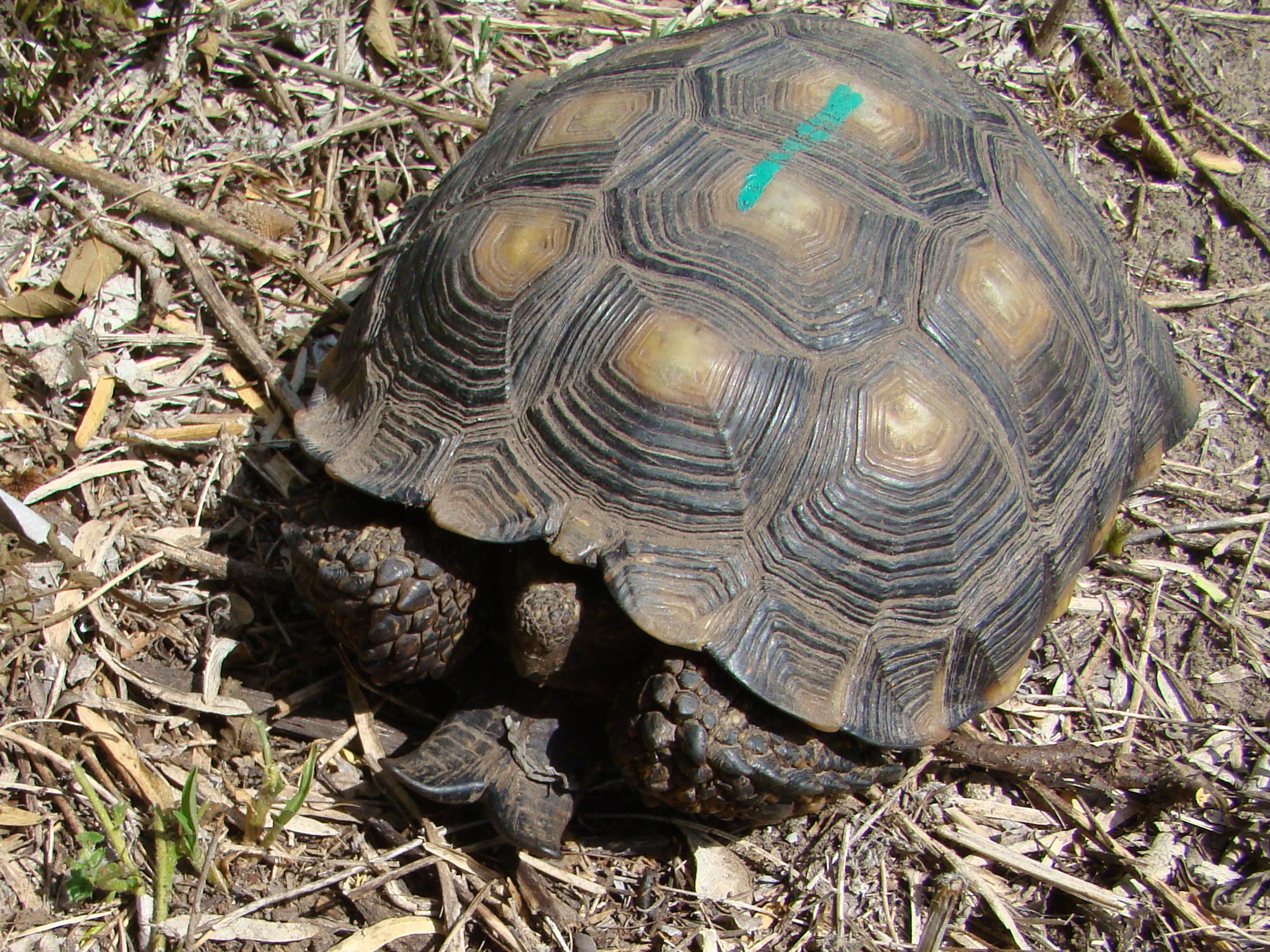
Gopherus berlandieri, Bee Co. Texas, USA (June 2011).

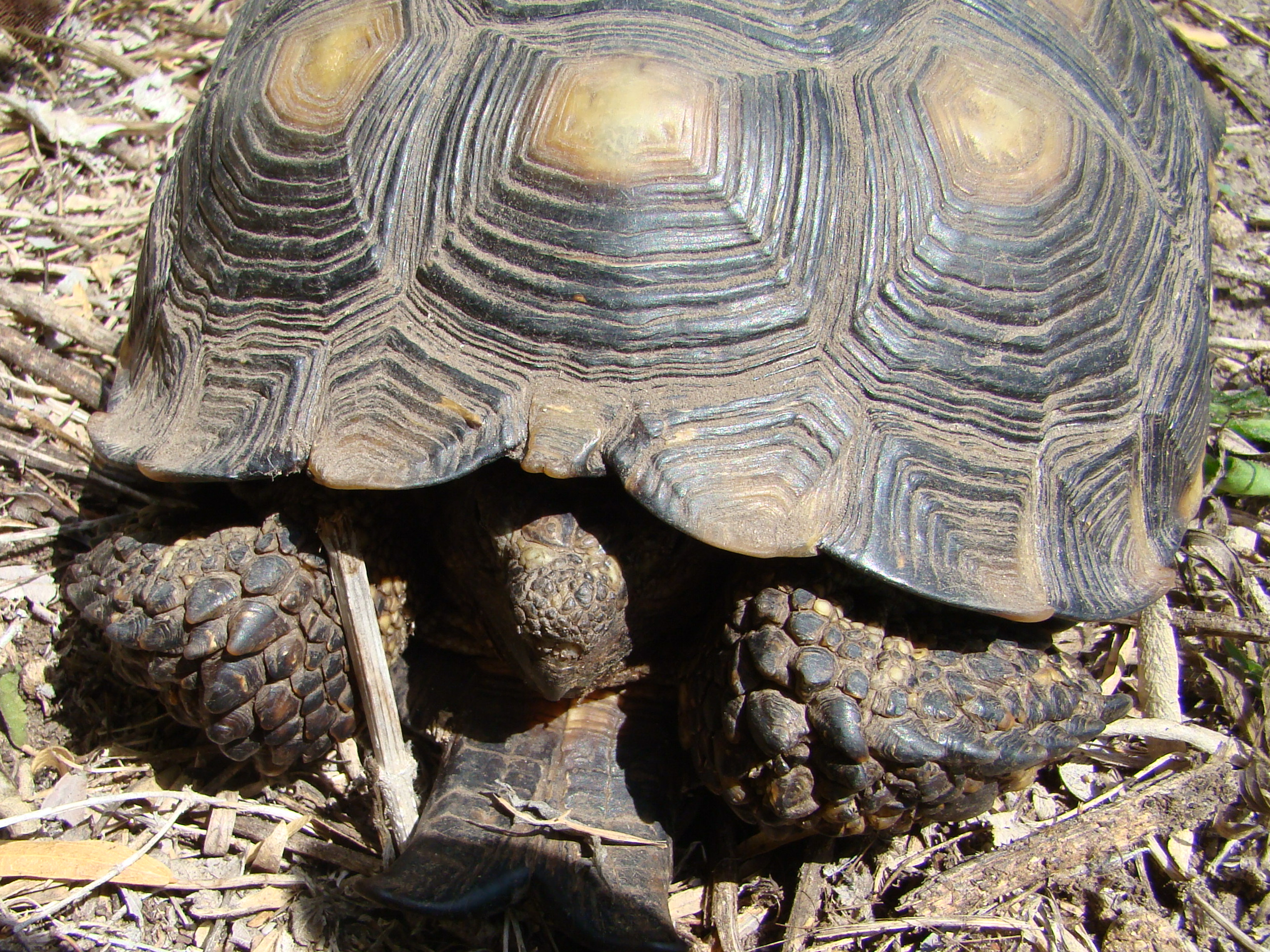
Gopherus berlandieri, Bee Co. Texas, USA (2011).

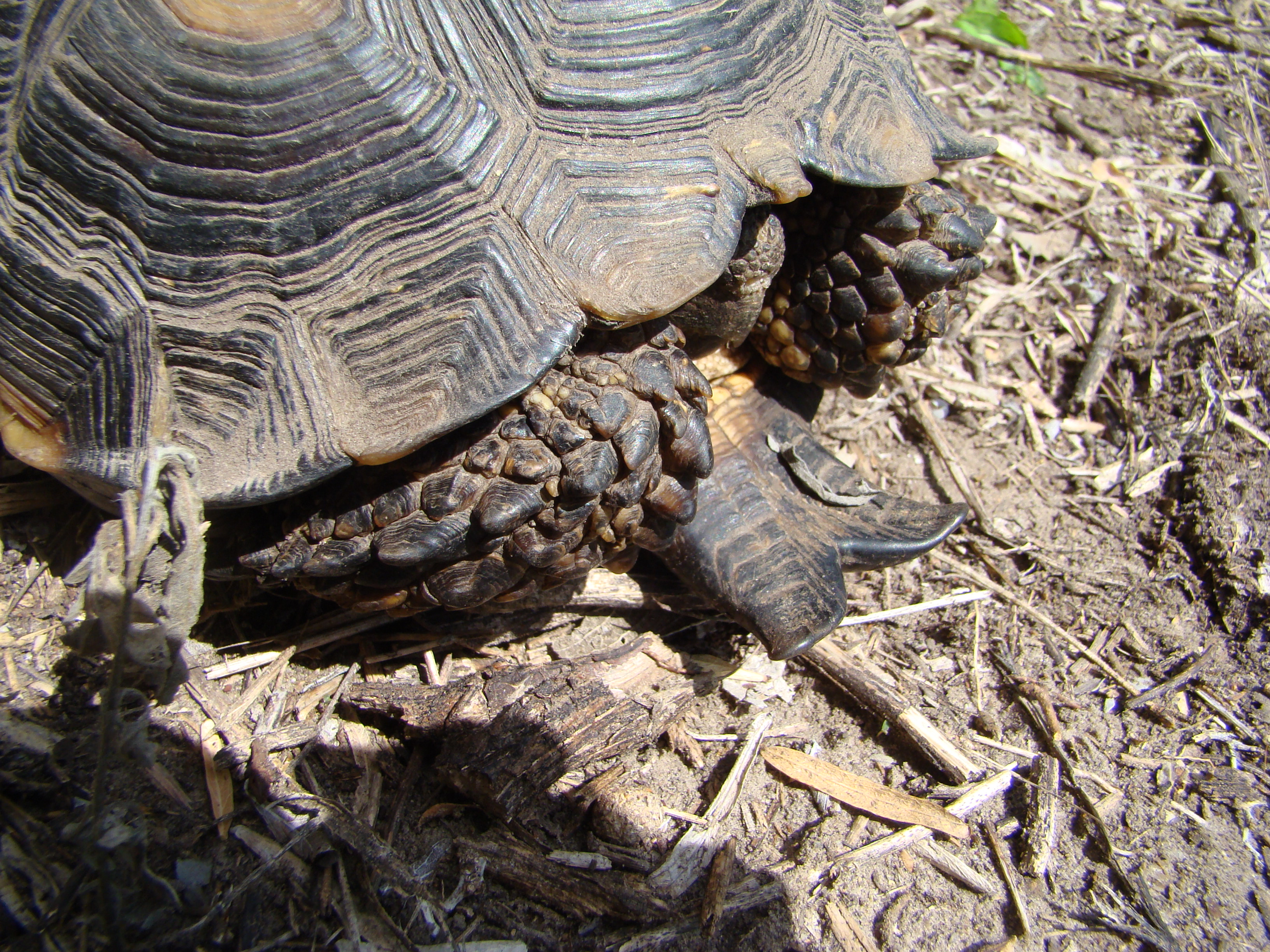
Elongated gular scutes of male, Bee Co. Texas, USA (2011).

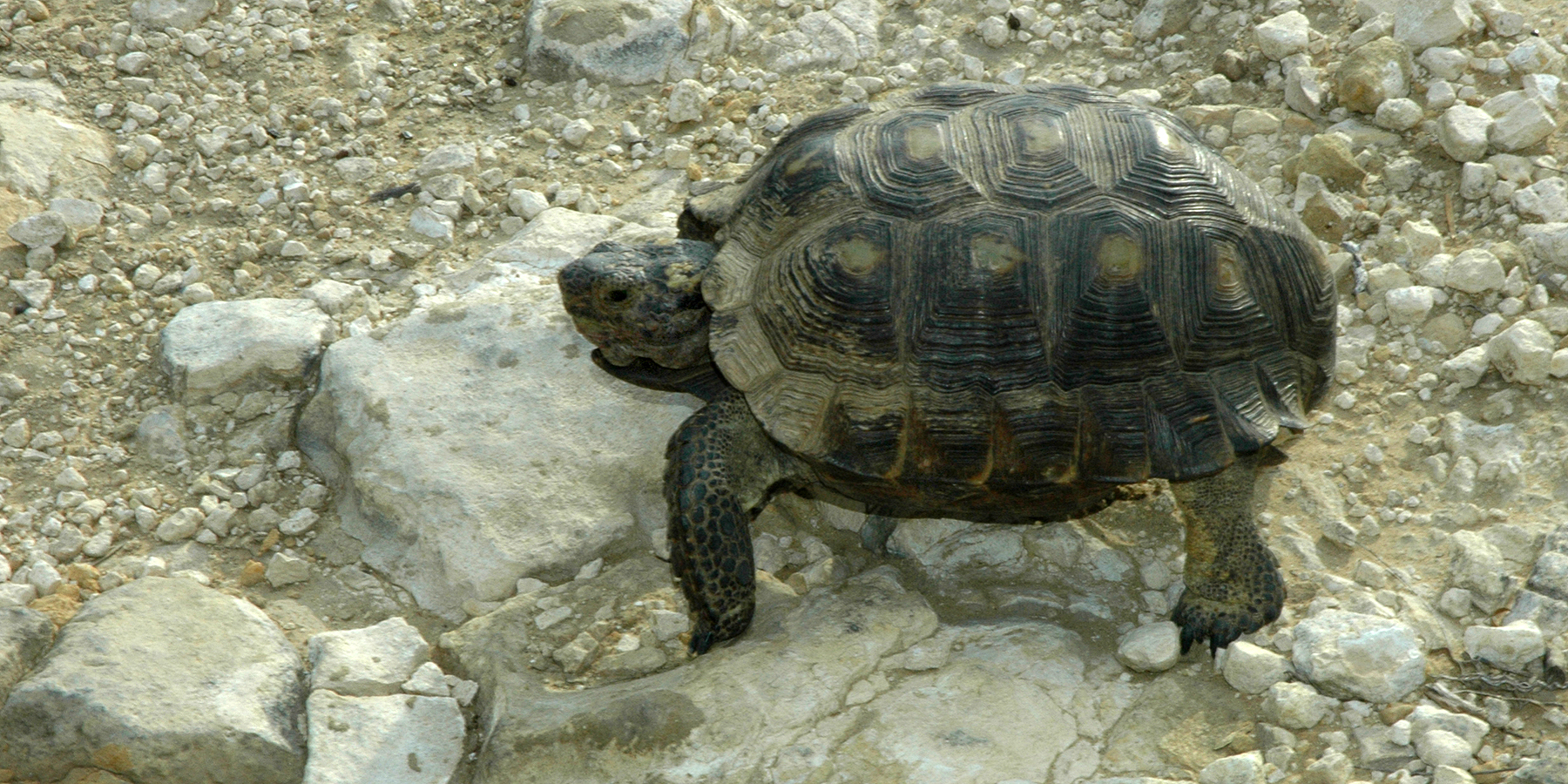
Texas tortoise (Gopherus berlandieri), northern Tamaulipas, Mexico (2007).

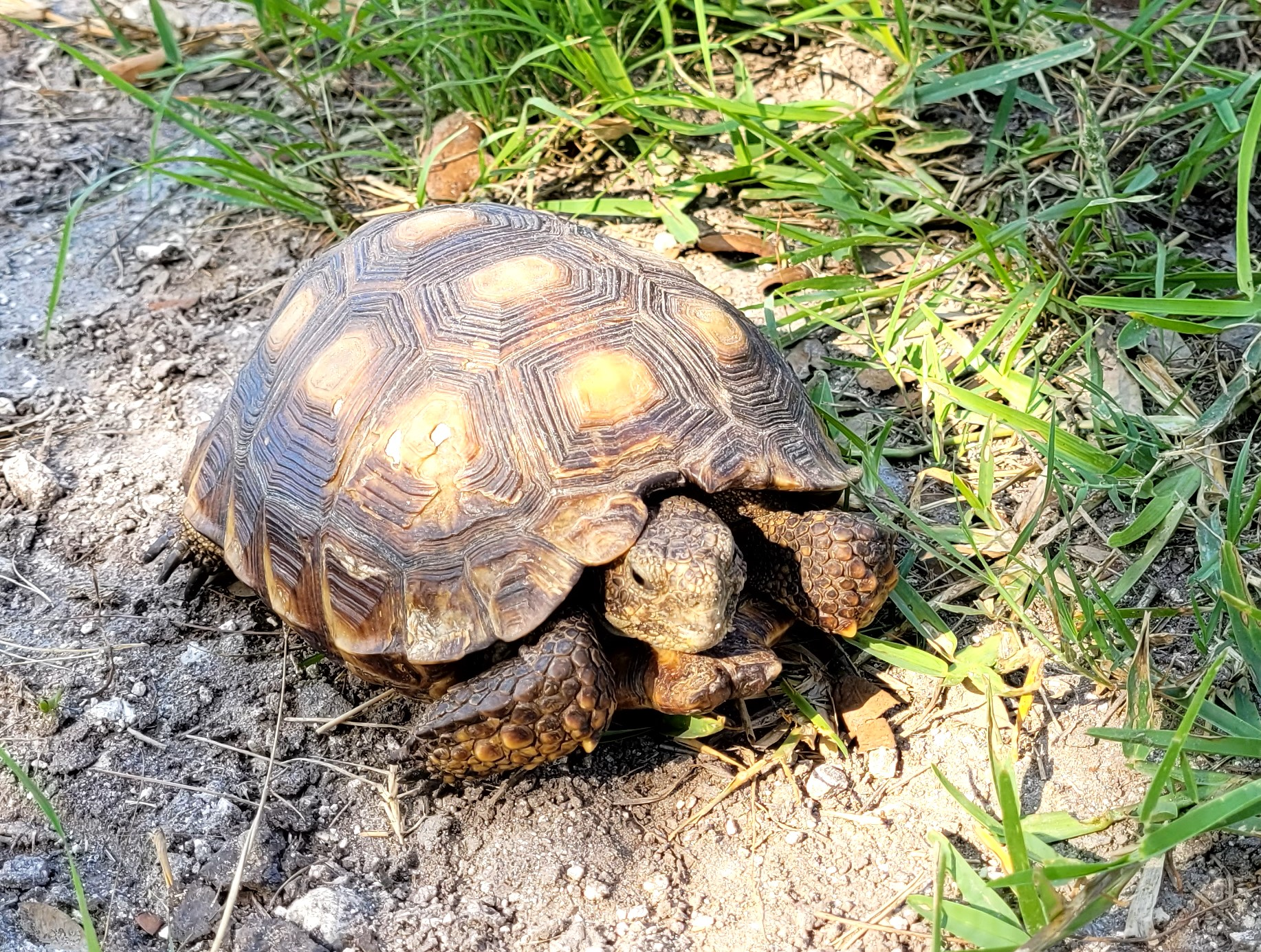
Texas tortoise (Gopherus berlandieri), Bee Co. Texas, USA (2023).
