= Dyskeratosis =

Medical condition

- Specialty: Dermatology

Dyskeratosis is abnormal keratinization occurring prematurely within individual cells or groups of cells below the stratum granulosum.

Dyskeratosis congenita is congenital disease characterized by reticular skin pigmentation, nail degeneration, and leukoplakia on the mucous membranes associated with short telomeres.

== See also ==
- Skin lesion
- Skin disease
- List of skin diseases
