= Hank Molt =

American reptile smuggler (born c.1940)

- Molt in 1958
- Born: Henry A. Molt c. 1940 (age 85–86)
- Occupation: Reptile dealer

Henry A. Molt Jr. (born c. 1940) is an American former reptile dealer who was convicted in three cases in 1979 and 1980 of illegally smuggling reptiles into the United States. In 2026, he was featured in the HBO Max/A24 documentary series Monsters of God.

== Reptile business ==
As a child, Molt became obsessed with reptiles. In 1964, he was featured in the Philadelphia Daily News for his successful classified ad offering a nine-foot ball python for sale. In 1965, he left a job as a salesman for Kraft Foods and bought a pet shop in Glenside, Pennsylvania, a suburb to the north of central Philadelphia. He sold off the dogs, cats, tropical fish, and birds, focused on reptiles, and renamed his business as the Philadelphia Reptile Exchange. He published a price list for exotic reptiles with what he described as "crazy prices". Within days, his "phone rang off the hook" with inquiries from major zoos who were setting up reptile houses. Molt began to search the world for exotic reptiles. By 1967, he was reported to have several hundred animals which he dealt in worldwide. He traveled to Madagascar, Australia, Fiji, Papua New Guinea, Thailand, India, and Sri Lanka, and brought back over 300 species of reptiles. Molt recalled that in the 1960s wildlife regulations were not hard to get around, and he could bring animals back in his handbag or suitcase. Tighter regulation made the work more difficult in the 1970s.

== Smuggling convictions ==
Marie Falladini, a former special agent with the U.S. Fish and Wildlife Service, described Molt as "the godfather of reptile smuggling". As Molt's operation grew, he recruited couriers to transport reptiles into the country. In 1974, former professional football player and stock broker Eddie Allen became one of Molt's couriers. After Allen and Molt went on an expedition together, a Fish and Wildlife agent took note of a large shipment of reptiles being transported into the country. When questioned, Allen admitted what they had done; he also panicked and moved the remaining animals to a location in the New Jersey Pine Barrens where he buried them alive to hide them from investigators. He later took investigators to the burial site.

In 1977, Molt was arrested and indicted on multiple counts. In 1980, he was convicted under the Lacey Act of illegally smuggling reptiles into the United States. He was sentenced to a 14-month jail term and $20,500 in fines. At the time, it was the stiffest sentence ever imposed in a wildlife-smuggling case.

In 1979, Molt was convicted in two other cases, one for smuggling ten radiated tortoises from Madagascar, and the other for smuggling six of the "world's rarest" iguanas from Fiji. In those cases, Molt was sentenced to concurrent one-year prison terms and fined $20,000. Prosecutors alleged that Molt had collected some 621 reptiles during a two-month expedition in 1974.

The judge overseeing the government's 1980 prosecution of Molt, Edward R. Becker, strongly criticized the prosecution for its zeal in pursuing Molt. The judge expressed his view that the government had not shown that Molt was significantly more culpable than the curators at prestigious zoos to whom Molt sold the reptiles. Judge Becker stated: "This is a case where the zoos are equally culpable, but nothing is happening to them."

Molt served 90 days in jail.

== Operation Chameleon ==
After his convictions, Molt was unable to sell directly to zoos. He began working with Tom Crutchfield, a reptile dealer in Florida. In the 1990s, Molt agreed to help Crutchfield hide Fiji iguanas, but the iguanas died, and Molt preserved the remains. Molt, who reportedly held a grudge against Crutchfield for "stealing his business", turned over the remains to Fish and Wildlife officials and became a government witness in connection with the prosecution of Crutchfield in an investigation, known as Operation Chameleon, that resulted in Crutchfield going to federal prison.

== Monsters of God ==
In August 2026, Molt was featured in the documentary film series Monsters of God produced by A24 and streamed on HBO Max. The first episode of the series focused on Molt and another reptile dealer, Tom Crutchfield. Interviewed for the series, Molt described the early reptile trade and his role in it: "The reptile world in those days was like a circus. ... I enjoyed the spectacle of it. I knew a lot about reptiles. I could hold my own with any zoo guy anywhere in North America. But some places you were just a smuggler because it was a smuggler's den. You had to be one of the bad guys. I was a bit of paradox in those days. An enigma for sure. A man of mystery somewhat by design, somewhat by default."

Filmmaker Eric Goode credits Molt for his positive contributions: "He brought in the first black-headed pythons that zoos started breeding. He brought in many Australian pythons that zoos had never seen before. ... A lot of the animals that you see in zoos today originated from what Hank Molt brought in to his reptile store in Philadelphia."
