= Lizard King =

Lizard King may refer to:

== People ==
- Jim Morrison (1943–1971), an American musician, singer for the Doors
  - The Lizard King, a play about Jim Morrison, starring Stephen Nichols
- Lizardking, stage name of Gustaf Grefberg (born 1974), Swedish musician
- Wong Keng Liang (born 1958), Malaysian wildlife trafficker
- Miles Mikolas (born 1988), American professional baseball pitcher

== Film and television ==
- The Lizard King (film), a 1988 Australian television film
- "The Lizard King" (Spider-Man), a 1997 TV episode
- Robert California, a fictional character on the American sitcom The Office

== Other uses ==
- Lizard King Records, a New York and London-based label
- Jacksonville Lizard Kings, a defunct minor league ice hockey team in Jacksonville, Florida, U.S.
- Lizard king (Dungeons & Dragons), a variant of the fictional Lizardfolk

== See also ==
- Island of the Lizard King, a 1984 single-player adventure gamebook
- King Lizard, an English rock band
- Moko (mythology), the king of lizards in the mythology of Mangaia in the Cook Islands
- Tomb of the Lizard King, a 1982 Dungeons & Dragons adventure module
