= Monsters of God =

American documentary series

- Genre: Documentary
- Directed by: Eric Goode
- Music by: Ari Balouzian; Slash
- Country of origin: United States
- Original language: English
- No. of episodes: 5

Production
- Executive producers: Eric Goode; Jeremy McBride; Josh Safdie; Ronald Bronstein; Eli Bush; Harry Go; Emily Osborne; Nicole Stott; Kevin Turen; Nancy Abraham; Lisa Heller; Tina Nguyen; Harrison Kreiss
- Producers: Tom Peterson; James Liu; Lissa Rivera; Callie Barlow; Charles Divak; Adrienne Gits; Daniel Johnson
- Cinematography: Benji Lanpher; Gabe Mayhan; Chris Messina; Ryan Nethery
- Running time: 51-58 minutes
- Production companies: HBO Documentary Films; A24; Goode Films; Central Pictures

Original release
- Network: HBO
- Release: August 6 – September 3, 2026

Monsters of God is a 2026 American documentary series directed and executive produced by Eric Goode. It follows the underworld of exotic reptile smuggling based on Bryan Christy's nonfiction book "The Lizard King: The True Crimes and Passions of the World's Greatest Reptile Smugglers".

It had its world premiere at the 2026 South by Southwest Film & TV Festival on March 13, 2026, where it won the Audience Award in the TV Premiere section. It premiered on HBO on August 6, 2026.

== Premise ==
Explores the underworld of exotic animal smuggling based on reptile dealers and traffickers first investigated and reported on by Bryan Christy in his 2008 nonfiction book The Lizard King: The True Crimes and Passions of the World's Greatest Reptile Smugglers.

== Episodes ==
| No. | Title | Directed by | Original release date |
|---|---|---|---|
| 1 | "The Fever" | Eric Goode | August 6, 2026 |
| 2 | "Operation Cobra" | Eric Goode | August 13, 2026 |
| 3 | "Smuggler's Inn" | Eric Goode | August 20, 2026 |
| 4 | "Operation Chameleon" | Eric Goode | August 27, 2026 |
| 5 | "Head of the Snake" | Eric Goode | September 3, 2026 |

== Production ==
In 2008, Eric Goode read the book The Lizard King by Bryan Christy, and met with Christy about optioning it. The book was already optioned by David Frankel. Goode later approached Fisher Stevens about making a documentary about the book, to which he replied: "How can you make this story without getting killed?". Eventually production commenced in 2014, with Goode alongside Josh and Benny Safdie going to Florida to begin interviewing Tom Crutchfield. Production on the series occurred simultaneously with Tiger King and Chimp Crazy. Over 200 interviews were conducted with the series, with some participants being cut from the series, due to time constraints. 1,500 hours of footage was overseen by 24-25 editors. The title of the series refers to a line stated by Crutchfield in the final episode, and does not intend to vilify reptiles.

== Release ==
The first episode of the series had its world premiere at the 2026 South by Southwest Film & TV Festival in March 2026, where it won the Audience Award in the TV Premiere section. The entire series was then broadcast on HBO beginning August 6, 2026.

== Reception ==
=== Critical reception ===
On the review aggregator website Rotten Tomatoes, the series holds an approval rating of 100%, based on 12 reviews. On Metacritic, it has a weighted average score of 73 out of 100 based on 5 reviews.

Joel Keller of Decider suggested viewing the series writing: "Monsters Of God shows that Eric Goode has cornered the market on docuseries that concentrates on the colorful personalities that surround the illegal possession of exotic animals, and those personalities are fascinating to watch." Rebecca Nicholson of Financial Times gave the series four out of five stars, writing: "This is a riveting story of money and greed, and crimes carried out for the love of cold blood."

== See also ==
- Eddie Allen (fullback)
- Tom Crutchfield
- Hank Molt
