= Viva la decadence =

Viva La Decadence
- King Lizard - Viva La Decadence

Studio album by King Lizard
- Released: 1 December 2010
- Recorded: 2008–2009
- Genre: Rock
- Length: 47:30
- Label: Psycho DeVito Records
- Producer: Andy Brook, Chris Tsangarides and King Lizard

Professional ratings
Review scores
Source	Rating
Classic Rock	
Sleaze Roxx -	
KOMODO Rock -	
Sonic Abuse -	
Critical Mass	
Pure Rawk Magazine UK -	
Sonic Shocks -	
BringBackGlam.com -	

Viva La Decadence is the debut album by English rock band King Lizard. A music video of the title track Viva La Decadence was released a month prior to the album.

== Track listing ==
1. "Viva La Decadence"
2. "Rain on You"
3. "Rock n' Roll Me"
4. "Hell Yeah"
5. "Video Lover"
6. "Kan't Kill Rock n' Roll"
7. "Never Be Mine"
8. "Not for Me"
9. "Riot"
10. "Taste the Hate"
11. "Outrageous"
12. "Late Nite Dynamite"

== Performers ==
- Flash Sawyer - vocals, piano
- Niro Knox - guitar, backing vocals
- Alice Rain - bass guitar
- Sky London - drums
