= Clark R. Bavin National Fish and Wildlife Forensic Laboratory =

US Fish and Wildlife laboratory in Ashland, Oregon, USA

Coordinates: 42.1944°N 122.6902°W

National Fish and Wildlife Forensics Laboratory
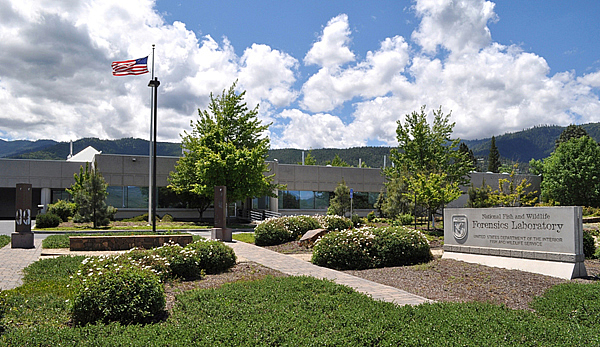
- Clark R. Bavin National Fish and Wildlife Forensic Laboratory
- Established: 1989
- Director: Ken Goddard
- Location: Ashland, Oregon, USA
- Affiliations: CITES
- Operating agency: United States Fish and Wildlife Service
- Website: http://www.fws.gov/lab

The National Fish and Wildlife Forensics Laboratory is located in Ashland, Oregon, United States. Built in 1988 and run by the United States Fish and Wildlife Service, the forensics laboratory is the only such laboratory in the world devoted to wildlife law enforcement. By treaty, the forensics laboratory is also the official crime lab for CITES (Convention on International Trade in Endangered Species) and the Wildlife Group of Interpol. The laboratory maintains an online feather database, called the Feather Atlas, which is available on their website. Ken Goddard serves as the current Lab Director.

== Mission ==
The primary mission of the laboratory is to identify the species or subspecies of pieces, parts or products of an animal to determine cause-of-death of an animal, to help wildlife officers determine if a violation of law has occurred and to identify and compare physical evidence in an attempt to link suspect, victim and crime scene.

== History ==
The laboratory was established as a result of the need for a wildlife crime laboratory for the United States Fish and Wildlife Service. The need for this laboratory was brought to the attention of the Fish and Wildlife Service by Terry Grosz and Ken Goddard. In 1986, the location of the laboratory was selected to be Ashland, Oregon partially due to the efforts of Dr. Wehinger, a chiropractor from Eagle Point, Oregon. By September, 1987, construction had begun on the laboratory, and finished a year later. The laboratory was dedicated as the National Fish and Wildlife Forensics Laboratory in 1989, only to be re-dedicated as the Clark R. Bavin National Fish and Wildlife Forensic Laboratory two years later to honor former Fish and Wildlife Service Law Enforcement Chief Clark Bavin. Later, in 2006, a 17,000 square foot addition was constructed to house their new wildlife pathology and genetics labs, along with an isolated room for their dermestid beetles. In 2007, the laboratory complied with a Homeland Security mandate to protect the building by using landscaping and gardens instead of conventional methods, such as fences and buffers.

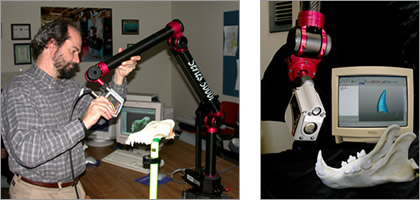
USFWS Laser Surface Scanner at the National Fish and Wildlife Forensic Laboratory

== Equipment ==
The laboratory utilizes various equipment, including:

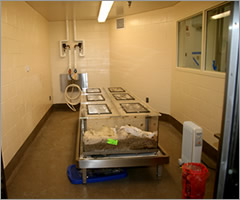
Air-tight room at the Fish and Wildlife Service's National Fish and Wildlife Forensic Laboratory containing dermestid beetles used for skeletonization

- Dermestid Beetle Colonies
- Laser Surface Scanner
- Ballistics Tank
- Mass Spectrometers
- Liquid Chromatograph
- Infrared Spectrometer
- X-Ray Fluorescence Spectrometer
- Various Microscopes

== Organization ==
The forensics laboratory is divided into six major units:

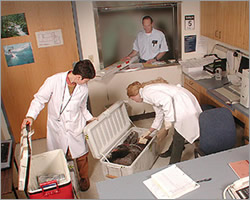
Evidence Processing, part of Administration

- Administration
  - Budget/Purchasing and Personnel
  - Clerical Support
  - Evidence Processing
  - Quality Assurance
  - Facilities Management
- Chemistry
- Genetics
- Morphology
  - Herpetology
  - Ornithology
  - Mammalogy
- Pathology
