= Skintight Jaguars =

British punk band

- Origin: London, England
- Genres: Alternative rock Punk rock
- Years active: 2004 – 2011
- Labels: Hustler Squad Records; MSKL Records; Wilde Club Records; Zodiac Killer Records
- Members: Ryan Simmonds; J Machete; Matt Valentine
- Past members: Kip Legend; Famus Shamus; Carl Muskel; Niro Knox
- Website: www.myspace.com/skintightjaguars

Skintight Jaguars were an English hard rock/punk band from London, England. They are currently on an indefinite hiatus. The last line-up consisted of guitarist/vocalist Ryan Simmonds, bassist Matt Valentine and drummer J Machete. Original singer Kip Legend left the band in 2009 after relocating to Oslo, Norway.

The band supported Backyard Babies on their 2008 tour of the UK.

Music journalist Malcolm Dome described them as "Decadently apocalyptic" in Rock Sound magazine.

== History ==
The band originally formed in 2002 under the initial guise of Sneaking Fog after meeting while studying at the Norwich School of Art & Design. What started off as a joke quickly became an ever-increasing career prospect due to high-profile support slots with The Darkness and The Quireboys.

In late 2004 the name was changed to Skintight Jaguars, and the first demo under the new name was released - "Black Russian" b/w "Lowdown Downtown". This was swiftly followed up with a single release of an old Sneaking Fog track, "Thunderbone", on the independent Norwich based label Wilde Club Records in early 2005. Garnering the band radio play in Italy, Denmark and on Bruce Dickinson's BBC Radio 6 Rock show in the UK.

Guitarist Famus Shamus left the band in early 2005 resulting in a lengthy downtime for the band. After months of auditioning guitarists, the band finally settled on Israeli born guitarist Niro Knox who became the next full-time member of the band.

Six new tracks were recorded with guitarist Niro in late 2005, overseen by producer/bassist John McCoy, best known for his work with Gillan, Mammoth and production duties on the debut album by UK Subs. These recordings were never released and Niro quit the band to play with London-based glam rockers King Lizard. Niro was replaced by ex-Plastiques bassist Carl Muskel who took over the vacant guitar slot in early 2006.

2006 saw a brief hiatus for the band in a conscious effort to start something fresh musically. This resulted in a dramatic change in sound with something more akin to the members' punk influences, taking on a preferred 'wall-of-noise' sound and the use of simplistic chord structures in reference to The Ramones and Motörhead. After months of working on this new sound, the Start The Fight EP finally surfaced on their own independent label Hustler Squad.

During this time the band also recorded a version of Turbonegro's "Denim Demon". This track appeared on their Myspace profile, but is officially unreleased.

Another line-up change resulted in more delays at the end of 2006 when guitarist Carl Muskel relocated to Los Angeles. Ryan 'Jean' Simmonds was already on standby and immediately recruited into the band as guitarist. He had previously played in an early formation of the band called Electrobitch in 2003, and was also another ex-graduate of the Norwich School of Art & Design. The band then spent the next six months crafting new songs for an album. In 2007, Skintight Jaguars released their debut album, The Curse, on MSKL Records, (later re-released in May 2008 on Zodiac Killer Records), which also featured some remastered/remixed tracks from the Start The Fight EP.

In 2008 they toured the UK with Backyard Babies and Crucified Barbara, but by early 2009 singer Kip Legend had left the band and relocated to Oslo, Norway. After auditioning singers the band finally decided that guitarist Simmonds would take over vocal duties while continuing to play the guitar. From 2009 the band played as a three-piece.

In October 2010, Skintight Jaguars were announced as the winners of the Relentless Energy Drink band search, in conjunction with Myspace. This confirmed them as the opening band for the Relentless Energy Drink Sessions Festival on 23 October 2010, supporting headliners The Damned Things made up from members of Anthrax, Fall Out Boy and Every Time I Die.

At some point in 2011 the band went on hiatus, they currently have no plans to reform.

Since forming they performed alongside many high-profile bands including Eighties Matchbox B-Line Disaster, Towers of London, Vice Squad, The Dresdens, The Vibrators, The Lords of Altamont, Zodiac Mindwarp, Young Heart Attack, The Damned Things, and Backyard Babies.

== Members ==
- Lead guitar/vocals: Ryan Simmonds (2006–2011)
- Bass/Backing vocals: Matt Valentine (2002–2011)
- Drums/Backing vocals: J Machete (2002–2011)

== Past members ==
- Lead vocals: Kip Legend (2002–2009)
- Lead guitar: Carl Muskel (2005–2006)
- Lead guitar: Niro Knox (2005)
- Lead guitar: 'Famus' Shamus (2002–2005)

== Discography ==
=== Albums ===
- The Curse (2007) Re-released in USA (2008).

=== EPs ===
- The Death of Rock N Roll CD (2010)
- Start The Fight CD (2006)

=== Singles ===
- "Thunderbone" 7" Vinyl (2005)
- "Black Russian" b/w "Lowdown Downtown" CD (2004)

== Extra information ==
- Matt Valentine and Kip Legend can both be seen in the 2005 music video "You’re Speaking My Language" by Juliette and The Licks.
- The band are frequently known to cover songs by Turbonegro, Dead Boys, The Dwarves and Motörhead at live shows.
- Promo only single "Dead From The Face Down" received B-List rotation airplay alongside bands like Soulfly, Within Temptation and Alkaline Trio on UK radio station Total Rock in February 2006.
