= Eddie Allen (fullback) =

American football player (1918–2012)

No. 3
- Positions: Fullback, linebacker

Personal information
- Born: May 5, 1918; Dansville, New York, U.S.
- Died: March 1, 2012 (aged 93); Colorado Springs, Colorado, U.S.
- Listed height: 6 ft 1 in (1.85 m)
- Listed weight: 200 lb (91 kg)

Career information
- High school: Batavia (Batavia, New York)
- College: Pennsylvania (1938–1940, 1946)
- NFL draft: 1946: 11th round, 94th overall pick

Career history

Playing
- Chicago Bears (1947); Brooklyn Dodgers (1948)*
- * Offseason or practice squad member only

Coaching
- Upper Darby HS (1949) Offensive assistant coach; Drexel (1950–1957) Head coach

Career NFL statistics
- Rushing yards: 16
- Rushing average: 1.3
- Stats at Pro Football Reference

Head coaching record
- Career: College: 33–24–1 (.578)

Edward Bostwic Allen Jr. (May 5, 1918 – March 1, 2012) was an American professional football player who was a fullback for one season in the National Football League (NFL) with the Chicago Bears and one season in the All-America Football Conference (AAFC) for the Brooklyn Dodgers. Allen played college football at the University of Pennsylvania, and was head football coach at Drexel University.

== Early life ==
Allen attended Batavia High School in Batavia, New York, where he was raised.

== College and military service ==
Allen enrolled at the University of Pennsylvania. He won varsity letters for the Penn Quakers football teams in 1939 and 1940.

His college career was interrupted by service in the United States Army Air Forces during World War II. He served until 1945 and achieved the rank of captain.

Upon leaving the military, he returned to Penn for his fourth and final season. Allen was an All-American honorable mention at Penn.

== Professional football ==
Allen was selected by the Chicago Bears with the 94th overall pick (11th round) in the 1946 NFL draft. Allen appeared in nine games for the 1947 Chicago Bears, starting five of them. He played as both a fullback and a punter, recording 12 rushing attempts for 16 yards and eight punts for 299 yards (37.4 yards per punt average).

The following year, Allen signed a contract for the Brooklyn Dodgers of the All-America Football Conference. He did not actually play for the team.

== Coaching career ==
Allen began coaching at Daniels Field in 1941. After serving as head coach at Upper Darby High School for the 1949 season, Allen was hired by Drexel University as head football coach in February 1950. Allen led 1955 Drexel Dragons football team to an undefeated season, the first in school history. In eight seasons as head coach at Drexel, Allen compiled a 33–24–1 record.

On January 10, 1958, Allen resigned as head coach in order to devote more time to an investment firm at which he had been recently given a major promotion.

== Monsters of God ==
In 2026, Allen was featured in the HBO/A24 documentary series, Monsters of God, for his role in an illegal reptile-smuggling enterprise in the 1970s. According to the documentary, after an investigation into reptile smuggling by Hank Molt, Allen buried alive over 50 snakes and other exotic reptiles, in a mass grave in the New Jersey Pine Barrens. Allen later showed the burial site to law enforcement. According to the documentary, Allen was criminally charged and received a $10,000 fine for his role in the enterprise.

== Head coaching record ==
=== College ===
Year	Team	Overall	Conference	Standing	Bowl/playoffs
Drexel Dragons (Independent) (1950–1957)
1950	Drexel	6–1			
1951	Drexel	3–4			
1952	Drexel	3–4			
1953	Drexel	2–3–1			
1954	Drexel	5–2			
1955	Drexel	8–0			
1956	Drexel	5–3			
1957	Drexel	1–7			
Drexel:		33–24–1			
Total:		33–24–1			

== Personal life ==
Allen is the father of Ted Allen, who signed with the Philadelphia Eagles, but never played with the team.
