= Navara (poacher) =

Mozambician poacher

- Born: Simon Ernesto Valoi; 1977 (age 47–48)
- Other names: Simon Tivani
- Occupation: Rhinoceros poacher
- Criminal charges: Poaching
- Criminal penalty: 30 years
- Criminal status: Incarcerated

Simon Ernesto Valoi (born c. 1977), nicknamed Navara, is a convicted Mozambician rhinoceros poacher.

== Biography ==
Navara was born c. 1977. His first crimes were stealing cars, where he got his nickname of Navara, because he often stole the Nissan Navara. He is also a fugitive wanted for two murder charges in South Africa. He poached rhinos in Kruger National Park, and controlled about 15 different poaching gangs. He lived in a mansion in the Massingir district that he constructed using profits from his poaching.

In 2015, Valoi was responsible for the kidnapping of Bartholomäus Grill of Der Spiegel, during which he threatened his life. Valoi was not arrested by the Massingir police, instead, Grill was fined for trespassing on Valoi's property.

On 26 July 2022, Valoi was arrested in a sting operation alongside an associate, Paulo Zukula in Maputo for possessing eight rhino horns, weighing 7.5 kilograms (17 lb), worth $470,000, from the Gaza Province. Pretending to be corrupt, they gave him a wiretapped mobile phone for him to make calls with, which they used to arrest his other associates. He was re-arrested in 2023, and is currently serving a 30-year prison sentence.

== See also ==
- Dawie Groenewald
