= United States Fish and Wildlife Service Office of Law Enforcement =

U.S. Fish and Wildlife Service Office of Law Enforcement
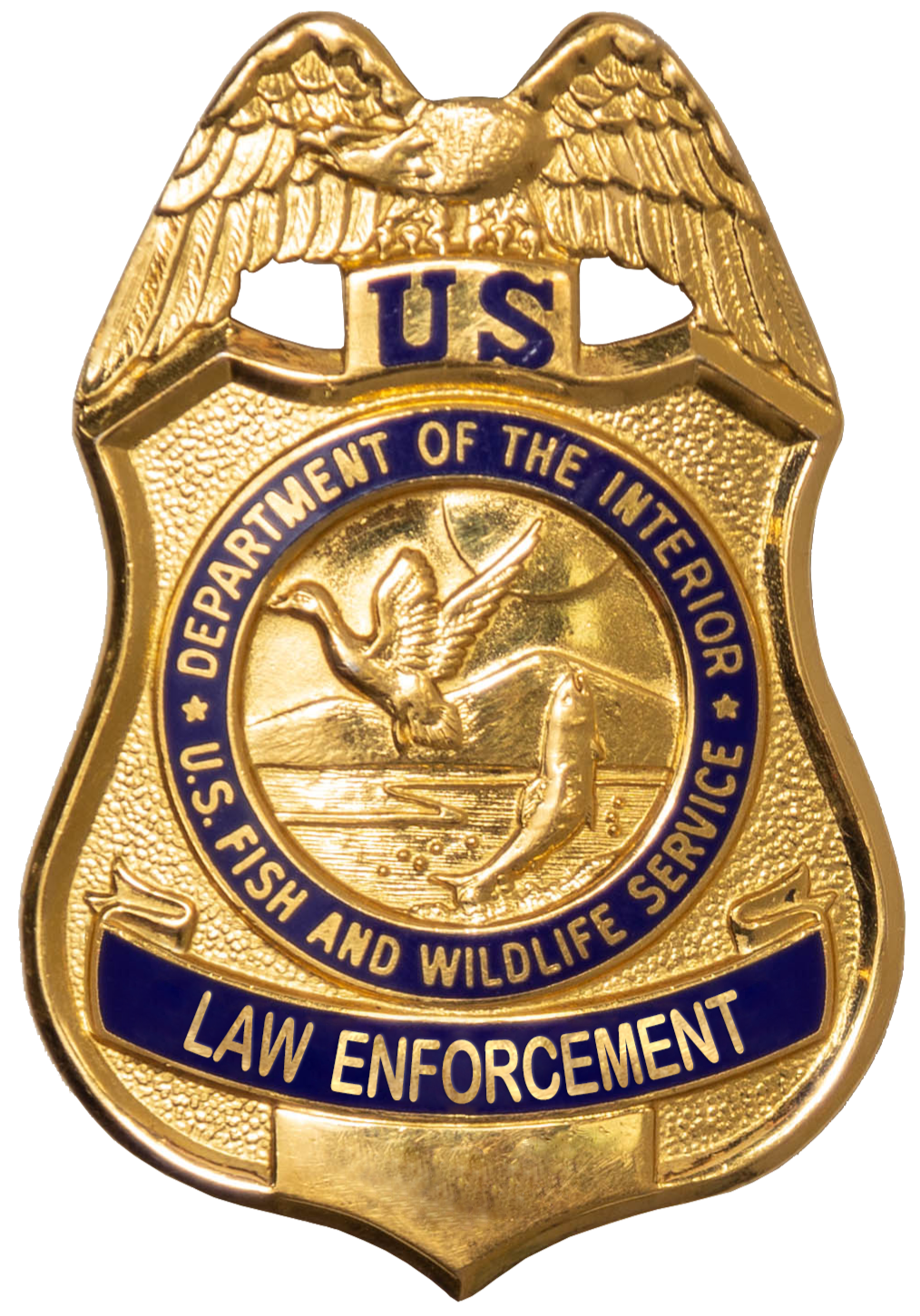
- Abbreviation: FWS OLE

Agency overview
- Formed: March 14, 1903; 123 years ago

Jurisdictional structure
- Legal jurisdiction: United States
- Governing body: Federal law enforcement

Operational structure
- Headquarters: Falls Church, Virginia
- Special Agents: 261
- Agency executive: Douglas Ault, Chief of Law Enforcement
- Parent agency: United States Fish and Wildlife Service

Website
- fws.gov

The United States Fish and Wildlife Service Office of Law Enforcement contributes to Service efforts to manage ecosystems, save endangered species, conserve migratory birds, preserve wildlife habitat, restore fisheries, combat invasive species, and promote international wildlife conservation.

== Operations ==
The Office of Law Enforcement focuses on potentially devastating threats to wildlife resource-illegal trade, unlawful commercial exploitation, habitat destruction, and environmental contaminants. The Office of Law Enforcement investigates wildlife crimes, regulates wildlife trade, helps Americans understand and obey wildlife protections laws, and works in partnership with international, state, and tribal counterparts to conserve wildlife resources. This work includes:

- Breaking up international and domestic smuggling rings that target imperiled animals.
- Preventing the unlawful commercial exploitation of protected U. S. species.
- Protecting wildlife from environmental hazards and safeguarding critical habitat for endangered species.
- Enforcing federal migratory game bird hunting regulations and working with states to protect other game species from illegal take and preserve legitimate hunting opportunities.
- Inspecting wildlife shipments to ensure compliance with laws and treaties and detect illegal trade.
- Working with international counterparts to combat illegal trafficking in protected species.
- Training other federal, state, tribal, and foreign law enforcement officers.
- Using forensic science to analyze evidence and solve wildlife crimes.

Distributing information and outreach materials to increase public understanding of wildlife conservation and promote compliance with wildlife protection laws.

== Training ==
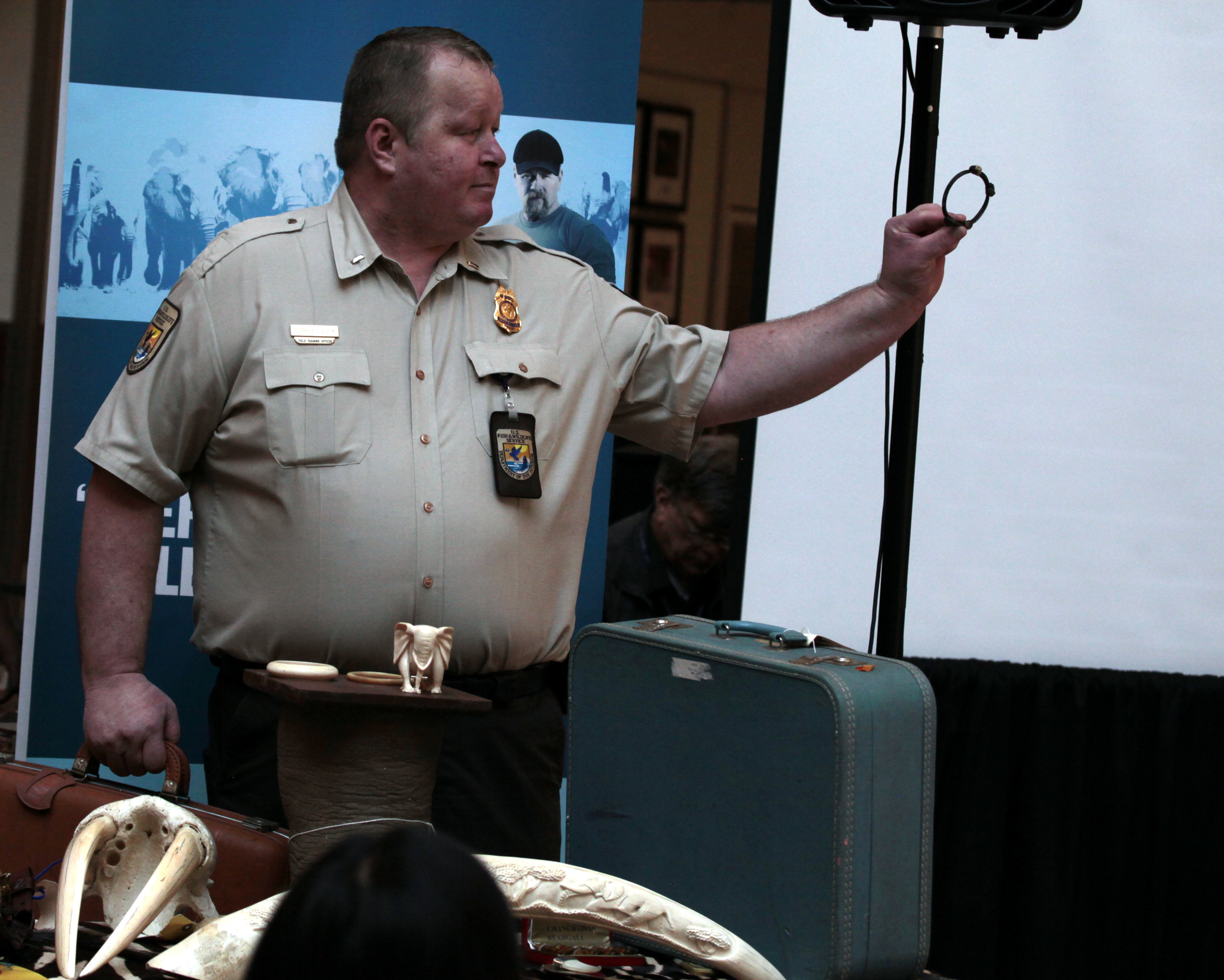
Wildlife Inspector shows a confiscated bracelet made of illegal elephant hair

In order to become a FWS Special Agent, an applicant must be between the ages of 23 and 37. However, due to the decision in Robert P. Isabella v. Department of State and Office of Personnel Management, 2008 M.S.P.B. 146, preference eligible veterans may apply after age 37. In 2009, the Office of Personnel Management issued implementation guidance on the Isabella decision: OPM Letter.

The applicant must also hold American citizenship and have a clean record. In addition, all special agents are required to sign a mobility agreement which indicates a willingness to accept a reassignment to any location as dictated by the needs of the Service.

New special agents attend the Federal Law Enforcement Training Center (FLETC) at Glynco, Georgia for 18 weeks of training. This training includes comprehensive courses in protective techniques, criminal law, use of special investigative equipment, use of firearms, and defensive measures. Rules of evidence, surveillance techniques, undercover operations, and courtroom demeanor are also studied. Classroom study is supplemented with on-the-job training when agents report to their assigned field stations. As agents in training, they assist in carrying out surveillance activities, participating in raids, interviewing witnesses and suspects, searching for physical evidence, seizing contraband, and serving search warrants. The emphasis on training and the vast experience they gain make U.S. Fish & Wildlife Service Special Agents among the best wildlife law enforcement professionals in the world.

== Resources ==
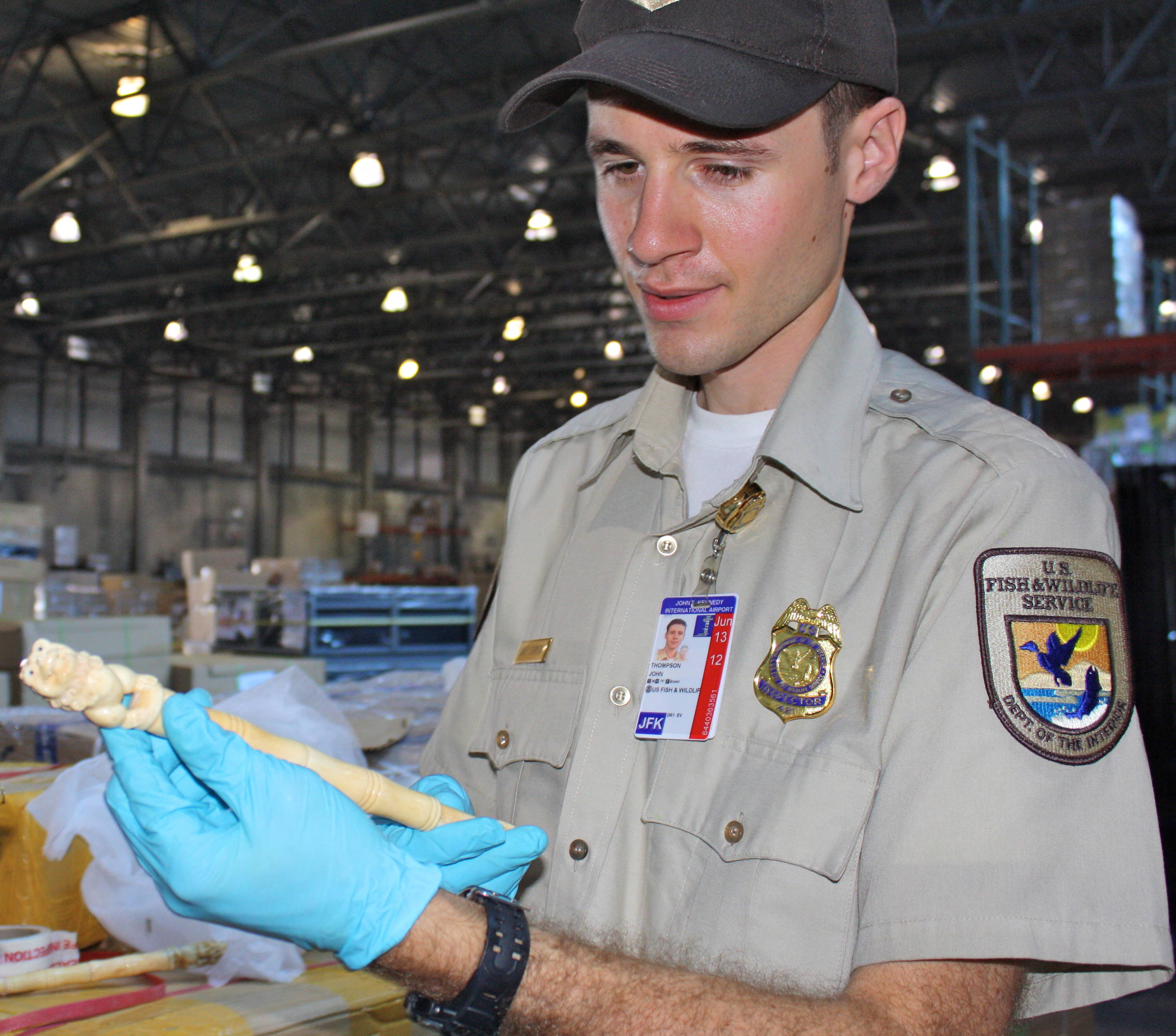
Inspector looks at an imported statue.

The Clark R. Bavin National Fish and Wildlife Forensic Laboratory conducts scientific analyses that support federal, state, and international investigations of wildlife crime. The Office of Law Enforcement also maintains a National Wildlife Property Repository, which supplies abandoned and forfeited wildlife items to schools, universities, museums, and non-government organizations for public education, and operates the National Eagle Repository, which meets the needs of Native Americans for eagles and eagle feathers for religious use.

The National Eagle and Wildlife Property Repository, near Denver, Colorado stores in a 16,000-square-foot (1,486 square meters) warehouse 1.5 million specimens, mainly products made from endangered animals: tiger, rhinoceros, sea turtle, crocodile and elephant. A row of shelves 50 feet long and 10 feet high stores the hides and mounted heads of big cat: cheetah, tiger, jaguar, margay, ocelot and leopard. An objective of the server is assuring the U.S. complies with the Convention on International Trade in Endangered Species of Wild Fauna and Flora. The treaty regulates wildlife commerce to assure the survival of threatened species. The specimens in the repository were seized in customs searches at U.S. ports of entry or being trafficked across state lines. The facility develops educational programs about wildlife trade, endangered species, and conservation laws.

When fully staffed, the Office of Law Enforcement includes approximately 261 Special Agents and 122 Wildlife inspectors. Eight regional law enforcement offices service the continental United States and it's territories. The current handgun in use is the Glock 22 .40 S&W.

== Laws Enforced ==
Special Agents enforce laws regarding the conservation and preservation of many plant and animal species throughout the United States and being brought into the country from elsewhere. Special Agents primarily focus on the enforcement of the following federal laws:

- Lacey Act
- Migratory Bird Treaty Act
- Bald and Golden Eagle Protection Act
- Endangered Species Act
- Migratory Bird Hunting and Conservation Stamp Act
- Marine Mammal Protection Act
- Airborne Hunting Act
- National Wildlife Refuge System Administration Act
- African Elephant Conservation Act
- Wild Bird Conservation Act
- Rhinoceros and Tiger Conservation Act
- Antarctic Conservation Act
- Archaeological Resources Protection Act of 1979

== Regional Offices ==
The Office of Law Enforcement is Headquartered in Falls Church, Virginia. In addition, there are eight regional offices that serve different geographical regions of the U.S.

- Region 1 (Pacific Region) - Headquartered in Portland, Oregon, serves Hawaii, Idaho, Oregon, Washington and the Pacific Trust Territories.
- Region 2 (Southwest Region) - Headquartered in Albuquerque, New Mexico, serves Arizona, New Mexico, Oklahoma, and Texas.
- Region 3 (Midwest Region) - Headquartered in Bloomington, Minnesota, serves Illinois, Indiana, Iowa, Michigan, Minnesota, Missouri, Ohio, and Wisconsin.
- Region 4 (Southeast Region) - Headquartered in Atlanta, Georgia, serves Alabama, Arkansas, Florida, Georgia, Kentucky, Louisiana, Mississippi, North Carolina, South Carolina, Tennessee, Puerto Rico and the U.S. Virgin Islands.
- Region 5 (Northeast Region) - Headquartered in Hadley, Massachusetts, serves Connecticut, Delaware, Maine, Maryland, Massachusetts, New Hampshire, New Jersey, New York, Pennsylvania, Rhode Island, Vermont, Virginia, and West Virginia.
- Region 6 (Mountain-Prairie Region) - Headquartered in Denver, Colorado, serves Colorado, Kansas, Montana, Nebraska, North Dakota, South Dakota, Utah, and Wyoming.
- Region 7 (Alaska Region) - Headquartered in Anchorage, Alaska, serves Alaska.
- Region 8 (Pacific Southwest Region) - Headquartered in Sacramento, California, serves California and Nevada.

== Notable cases ==
In Operation Chameleon the office undertook action against several internationally operating reptile smuggling networks. The investigations led to several convictions.

In her book, Hunt for Justice, retired Special Agent Lucinda Schroeder details the Service's undercover program to arrest and convict Alaskan hunting guides who were poaching in Alaska's northern Brooks Range.
