= Dawie Groenewald =

South African hunter and convicted poacher

- Born: Dawie Jacobus Groenewald; 1968 (age 57–58)
- Occupations: Safari operator, game farmer
- Years active: 1990s–present
- Employer(s): Out of Africa Adventurous Safaris, Valinor Trading CC
- Organization(s): Musina Mafia, Groenewald Gang
- Spouse: Sariette Groenewald
- Criminal charges: 1,600+ charges related to racketeering, wildlife trafficking and poaching

Dawie Jacobus Groenewald (born c. 1968) is a South African game farmer, hunting safari operator and convicted wildlife trafficker. Groenewald has been charged with four years in prison or the option of a 2m rand fine after facing more than 1,600 criminal charges related to wildlife trafficking and rhino poaching in South Africa, as part of the largest wildlife crime case in the country's history. In 2010, he was convicted of wildlife smuggling after illegally importing a leopard trophy to the United States. In 2014, the United States Justice Department indicted Groenewald and his brother on 18 charges related to trafficking and wildlife crimes offenses, although as of 2026, he has not been extradited.

== Biography ==
Groenewald owns and operates a 10,600 acre game farm, Pragtig outside of Musina, Limpopo and runs a safari business known as Out of Africa Adventurous Safaris. Before becoming a safari operator and game farmer, Gronewald was a police officer.

=== Out of Africa Adventurous Safaris ===
Beginning in the 1990s, Out of Africa Adventurous Safaris advertised safari trips to hunting clubs in the United States, notably in Michigan and at trade shows. The company organised hunting tours in Botswana, Tanzania, South Africa and Zimbabwe. Groenewald managed the company with his brother Janneman Groenewald, who lived in Autauga County Alabama, where he managed the company's U.S. operations.

In 2003, Gronewald began offering hunting tours of Zimbabwe. Critics alleged Gronewald and Out of Africa operated illegal safaris on the lands of evicted white farmers and was insulated from scrutiny by ties to the country's ZANU-PF government. In September 2005, Gronewald and Out of Africa Adventurous Safaris was banned from entering Zimbabwe by the country's Parks and Wildlife Management Authority. At the time, David Coltart, a Zimbabwean cabinet official, described Gronewald's operation as "a cruel organisation which has no respect for the environment".

Groenewald denied his company was operating unethically. He said, "The white Zimbabweans hunting in Zim don't want anyone else coming in there to hunt—they hate South Africans coming to hunt in their kingdom".

In 2010, despite the ban, it was reported that Gronewald still offered hunting safari tours in Zimbabwe, under the moniker Africa Dream Safaris.

In 2006, Groenewald was suspended from the South African Professional Hunters Association over accusations of poaching and for bringing the organisation into disrepute. At the time, other big game hunters alleged Gronewald was hunting illegally on his safari hunts. Game farm owner and big game hunter Dale McClelland notified Safari Club International about Gronewald's conduct, but the organization's ethics committee did not act on the allegations. An indictment by the United States Justice Department would later detail from 2005 to 2010, Out of Africa Adventurous Safaris charged American hunters up to $15,000 to shoot rhinoceros and other African wildlife without legal permits.

=== Lacey Act conviction ===
In April 2010, Groenewald was arrested in the United States for importing an illegally caught leopard trophy to the United States. The leopard was killed by an Alabama hunter on an illegal South African hunt organised by Groenewald in 2006. Groenewald was indicted by the United States Justice Department and imprisoned in Alabama. He later pled guilty to violating the Lacey Act and was ordered to pay $30,000 in fines and $7,500 in restitution.

=== 2010 charges ===
In 2009, Groenewald and his wife purchased 36 rhinos from Kruger National Park allegedly for breeding for their game farm. In September 2010, Groenewald was arrested with nine other persons, including two veterinarians, a pilot and professional hunters who were charged with 1,872 counts of related to various crimes related to racketeering and illegal wildlife trafficking. Groenewald caught the attention of local officials in Limpopo Province after his neighbors reported rhino poaching and a low flying helicopter, belonging to Groenewald over their properties. When his property was searched, authorities found a "burial site of over a dozen horn-less rhinos", including some of those purchased from Kruger a year earlier. Other dehorned rhinoceros were sold to a local butchery to evade detection.

The 1,872 charges against Groenewald and his co-conspirators became the largest wildlife crime cases in South African history. The magnitude of the case, would drag through the South African court system for the next decade. While waiting for the trial to go to court, Groenewald was released on a R1,000,000 bail (more than $50,000 US dollars), said to be the largest amount ever paid for a wildlife felony case. Bryan Christy reported authorities traced 439 rhino horns to activities at Groenewald's game farm. At the time of Groenewald's arrest, he additionally faced a number of civil lawsuits from members in the hunting community, and was subject to a no-contact order after issuing a death threat to a former business partner.

In 2012, the government of South Africa seized R55,000,000 from Groenewald and his co-conspirators, through the country's civil asset forfeiture laws. At the time, the value of assets seized was worth $7 million US dollars. Despite his pending charges, on bail, Groenewald received several permits from the Government of South Africa to hunt white rhinos, as well as serval, leopard, civet cats and a wild cat. In 2013, the South African government proposed a plan to legalise the trade in rhino horn, aiming to work with the private sector to eliminate poaching through a legal trade.

=== Czech Republic investigation ===
In September 2013, authorities from the Czech Republic investigating the illegal trade in white rhino horns imported to the Czech Republic from South Africa traced falsely declared rhino horn to hunts that took place on Groenewald's farm. Horns imported to Europe by fictitious hunters and declared as part of legal hunting trophies were found to be sold on to buyers in Asia for traditional medicine purposes. The Czech Environmental Inspectorate found a Vietnamese entity paid for Czech hunters to participate in rhino hunts, but was unable to find Czech hunters in South Africa with valid CITES permits. The investigation's findings would lead to sweeping changes in EU import policies for wildlife trophies. Czech authorities would later charge three Vietnamese individuals for their role in the smuggling ring.

=== 2014 United States Indictment ===
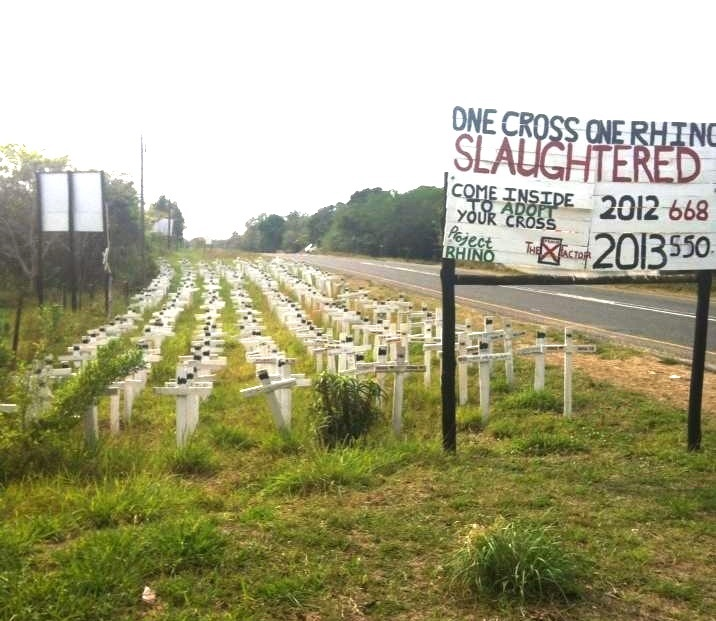
Project Rhino memorial to rhinos killed by poachers near St Lucia Estuary, KwaZulu-Natal, South Africa

In October 2014, Groenewald and his brother Janneman Groenewald were indicted on 18 counts of conspiracy and fraud related to illegal rhino hunting by the United States Department of Justice. Prior to the indictment, the Justice Department investigated the Groenewald's and Out of Africa safari company under "Operation Preposterous", which looked into illegal hunting of live rhinoceros in South Africa. The operation outlined a multitude of charges and activities that took place between 2005 and 2010. The Justice Department disclosed the brothers sold numerous illegal rhinoceros hunts to American hunters under the guise of culling "problem" animals. The horns would later be sold on the black market. The Groenewalds were subsequently charged with multiple Lacey act violations, conspiracy, mail fraud and bank fraud. U.S. Attorney George L. Beck Jr. said of the brothers,

"These defendants tricked, lied and defrauded American citizens in order to profit from these illegal rhinoceros hunts...Not only did they break South African laws, but they laundered their ill-gotten gains through our banks here in Alabama. We will not allow United States' citizens to be used as a tool to destroy a species that is virtually harmless to people or other animals."

At the time of the indictment, both Groenewald brothers were living in South Africa and would need to be extradited to the United States. In 2015, the United States reportedly was attempting to extradite the brothers to the United States for trial. In 2017, Dawie and Janneman Groenewald were apprehended on an international arrest warrant by Interpol in Polokwane. The brothers successfully raised bail and the extradition hearing was postponed. Dawie Groenewald's lawyer argued extradition laws required South Africa to finalize his client's pending cases prior to extradition. At the time, South Africa had not yet tried Groenewald for the 1,872 pending charges in his 2010 case.

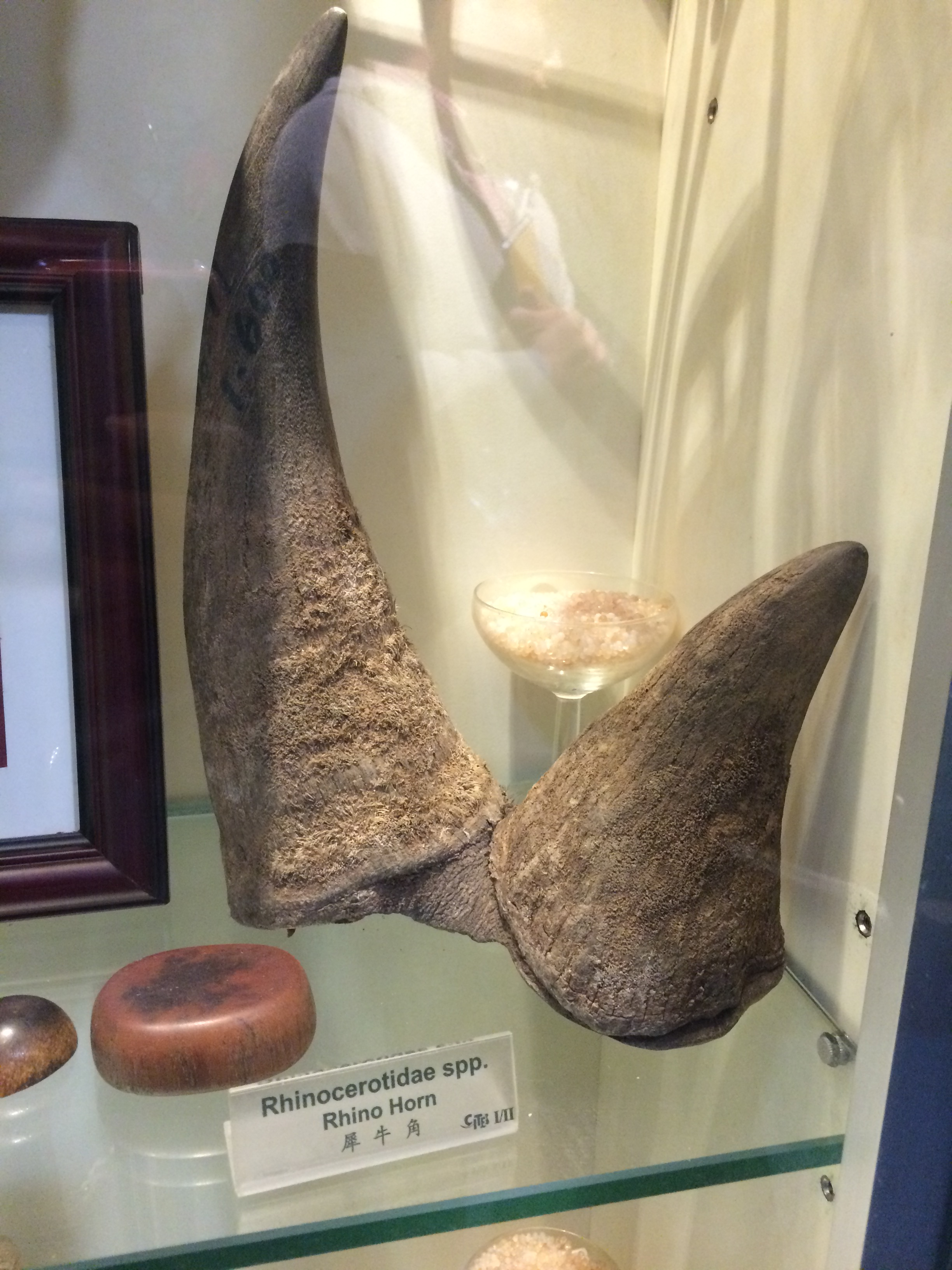
Example of rhino horn seized by the Hong Kong government. Groenewald is alleged to have sold rhino horn abroad, in violation of CITES.

While on bail, Dawie Groenewald continued to operate as a safari guide and big game hunter in South Africa and abroad. Janneman Groenewald died in December 2018.

=== Legalised rhino horn markets ===
In late 2017, South Africa's Department for Environmental Affairs removed a moratorium that banned domestic trade in rhino horn. Conservation groups highlighted the policy was due to intense pressure by domestic game farm owners.

That year, a portrait of Groenewald by Brent Stirton was part of the winning submission of the Natural History Museum's Wildlife Photojournalist Story Award. The portrait was included in a series by Stirton on the lives and trafficking of rhinos in South Africa. Groenewald's inclusion was due to his advocacy towards legalising the trade in rhino horn.

=== 2021 charges ===
While on bail in July 2021, Groenewald and fellow game farmer Schalk Abraham Steyn were arrested in South Africa for the illegal possession and transport of 19 rhino horns. The value of the horns was estimated at R2.6 million. The pair were later released on bail. The case was set for trial in 2024. It was later delayed.

=== Trial delays and continued hunting ===
Groenewald and his co-defendants have not yet been brought to trial for the more than 1,800 charges brought against them in 2010. After numerous delays, in March 2024, the National Prosecuting Authority in Limpopo, scheduled the trial to be held in October and November 2024. That October, the court announced the case would be delayed once again. The court reported Groenewald and his co-defendants are scheduled to stand trial in the Limpopo High Court on February 9, 2026. The charges involve illegally hunting rhinos, dealing in rhino horn, racketeering and money laundering.

In July 2025, animal rights NGOs and community members from Tobere, Kaputura, and Kycia villages in Botswana called for answers after Groenewald and his company were announced as beneficiaries of a hunting quota by the Tcheku Community Trust. Advocates said the provision of hunting privileges to an individual currently awaiting trial for wildlife trafficking charges called into question the governance of the Tcheku Community Trust.

=== Sentencing ===
In June 2026, Groenewald was sentenced to four years imprisonment or paying a 2m rand fine for his charges. The sentencing came 16 years after Groenewald was first charged in the case.

== See also ==
- Rhinoceros poaching in Southern Africa
- Edna Molewa, South African politician who came under scrutiny for ties to Groenewald and his associates
- Navara
