= Operation Chameleon =

1990s US operations against reptile smugglers

- Operation name: Operation Chameleon
- Type: Endangered Species Act Enforcement

Participants
- Planned by: United States Fish and Wildlife Service
- Executed by: United States, Mexico, Belize
- No. of countries participating: 6

Mission
- Target: Endangered Species Smugglers, Keng Liang "Anson" Wong

Timeline
- Date executed: 14 September 1998

Results
- Suspects: 26+
- Arrests: 26

Operation Chameleon was a series of undercover operations performed by the Office of Law Enforcement of the United States Fish and Wildlife Service (FWS) with the aim of rounding up several reptile smuggling rings. The operation lasted five years, starting during the second half of the 1990s and was mainly concerned with violations of laws as the Lacey Act and Endangered Species Act. The FWS cooperated with law enforcement agencies around the world.

== Investigations ==
Operation Chameleon managed to capture 26 animal smugglers, originating from six countries.

=== Anson Wong ===
Keng Liang "Anson" Wong, a Malaysian citizen known as the "Lizard King" after publication of the book, The Lizard King by Bryan Christy, was deemed to be responsible for the biggest global animal smuggling ring that has been taken down. Wong owned a private zoo which he used to smuggle animals. He traded in the almost extinct Komodo dragons and critically endangered Chinese alligator. Prices for these animals were up to £20,000 and £11,000 respectively. Wong managed to smuggle reptiles to the United States by the use of an import/export business. He was also involved in the theft of critically endangered ploughshare tortoises from a breeding sanctuary in Madagascar. A grand total of 75 animals were stolen, and Wong possessed 37 of them. The whole heist was worth £500,000 on the black market. Wong was the main target of Operation Chameleon; in order to capture him, the FWS set up a fake company named PacRim. He offered two of the ploughshare tortoises to PacRim. The FWS managed to lure Wong to Mexico on 14 September 1998, as he refused to go to the United States because he had an outstanding warrant relating to a 1992 smuggling case. Wong was arrested as he stepped off the plane, and sent to a Mexican jail. In the United States, he was charged with smuggling more than 300 reptiles into its borders between January 1996 and August 1998, with a total worth of $500,000. Animals were smuggled from Indonesia, Hong Kong, Malaysia and the Philippines. Aside from his import/export business, Wong used human couriers, Federal Express shipments with false invoices and shipping documents, and the concealment of illegal animals within larger shipments of legal animals. He was charged for all these affairs as well. From Mexico, Wong fought extradition for two years. In 2000, he gave up his struggle against extradition and was transferred to the United States. On 7 June 2001, he was sentenced to 71 months of jailtime and a fine of $60,000. He was also prohibited from selling animals to anyone in the U.S. for three years after his release.

=== Crutchfield ===
Tom Crutchfield was considered to be one of the largest reptile smugglers to the United States by the Department of Justice. Crutchfield had previously served in jail after being convicted of smuggling Fiji Island Iguanas in 1995. Crutchfield had smuggled reptiles from Madagascar to the United States with help of several accomplices and an investigation into him was opened by the FWS. When he was notified of this in 1997 he fled to Belize. The Belizean authorities arrested him and expelled him to the United States. Crutchfield was sentenced to 30 months of prison after being convicted of reptile smuggling. His story featured on Locked up Abroad, season 7, episode 2.

=== Lehmeyer ===
Germans Leymeyer and Khloe, were involved in the Crutchfield case. They were suspected of personally smuggling the reptiles from Madagascar to the United States. They were convicted in 1996.
