= Tom Crutchfield =

American reptile breeder

Tom Crutchfield, also known as Tommy, is an American reptile breeder known for his extensive Homestead, Florida, facility and his 1999 arrest and conviction under Operation Chameleon for trafficking in exotic animals and violating the Lacey Act, which temporarily suspended his business. He has called himself "the Mick Jagger of the reptile business". The case was later featured on National Geographic's Locked Up Abroad. He is also the focus of the 2008 book by Bryan Christy, The Lizard King, along with Michael Van Nostrand of Strictly Reptiles, and the 2011 book Stolen World by Jennie Smith.

== Early life ==
Before becoming interested in reptiles, Tom was a carpet salesman.

== Work with reptiles ==
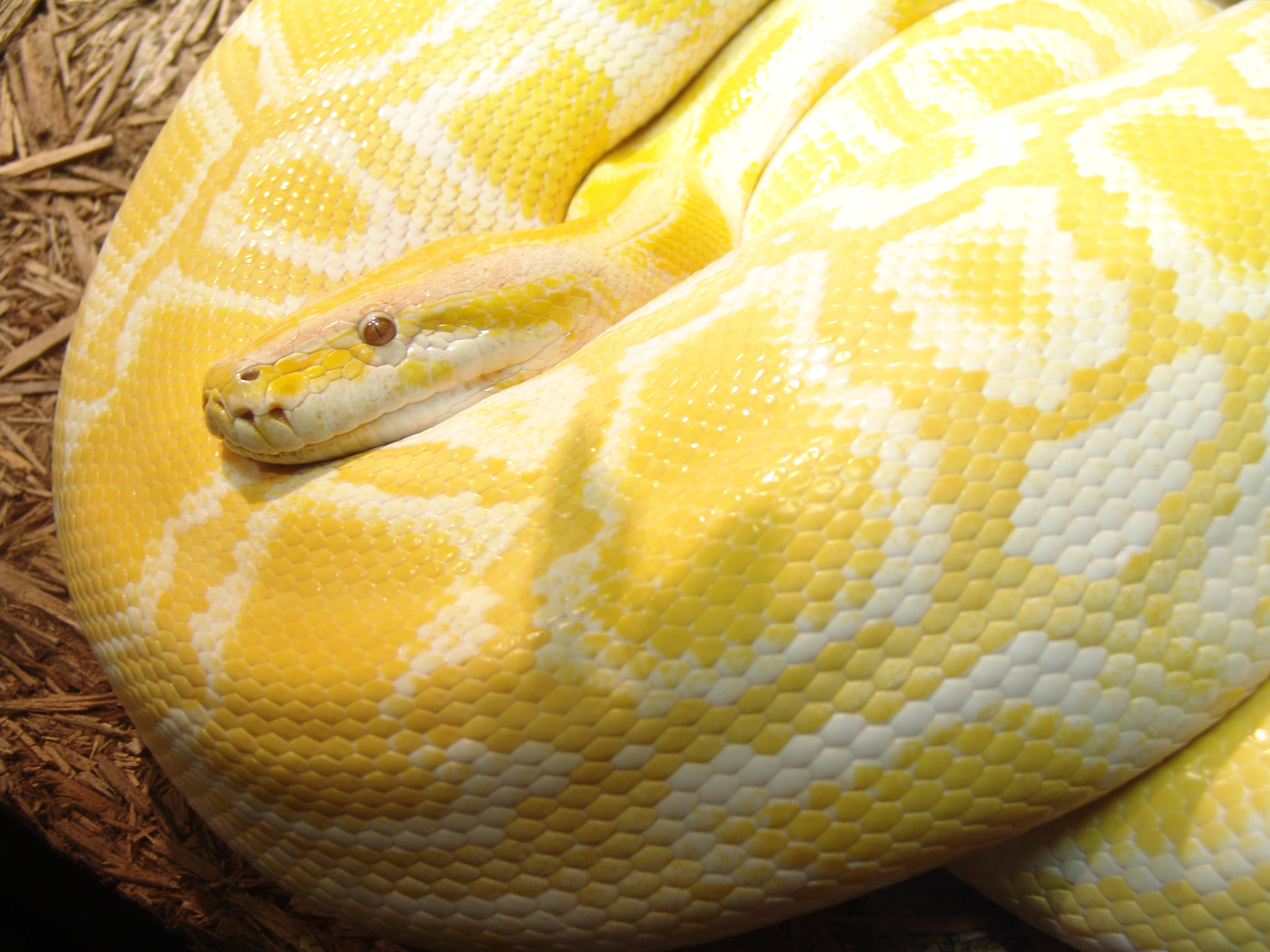
An albino Burmese python.

Crutchfield is well known for his work with reptiles. In 1981, he purchased the first documented amelanistic Burmese python from a Thai dealer, for US$21,000, after seeing the animal featured in a 1981 edition of National Geographic magazine. He then partnered with Bob Clark to produce the first captive-bred albino Burmese pythons from that animal. He also produced the first albino Iguana iguana and supplied reptiles to movies such as Indiana Jones and the Temple of Doom and Raiders of the Lost Ark.

== Reptile smuggling ==
In 1992 Tom was charged with illegally importing reptiles. The charge had little effect on business as that same year he imported sixteen Gaboon vipers and fourteen Burmese pythons via the Montgomery Zoo. Later, in 1995, Tom was convicted a second time, of illegally smuggling Fiji Banded Iguanas into the United States. The conviction was later reversed on appeal, with the Eleventh Circuit Court of Appeals finding that the prosecutor had engaged in misconduct by pursuing irrelevant testimony and inappropriately attacking witnesses' character during the initial case.

In 1997, US Marshals and the US Fish and Wildlife Service, under Operation Chameleon, informed Tom that he was under investigation for wildlife smuggling for the third time. In the 1997 charge, he was accused of conspiring with two German nationals, Wolfgang Kloe and Frank Lehmeyer, and a Japanese national, Kei Tomono, to illegally import over 200 reptiles and amphibians, including Madagascar tree boas, Madagascar ground boas, as well as a species of turtles, all species under the protection of CITES., Tom immediately fled to Belize, but he was extradited back to the US by officials there. Crutchfield was sentenced to 30 months in prison. Of his 1992–1999 smuggling activity, Tom stated that he was "guilty because I'm guilty."

== 2011 shooting ==
In March 2011, Tom's business partner and the owner of the snake farm property, Bruce Stephenson, arrived on the property with a gun and barricaded himself inside one of the buildings on the property. SWAT team members responded to the situation and initiated a standoff. Tom was grazed by a bullet, and the situation ended when gunfire ceased and an armed body was found inside the building.
