= Bryan Christy =

American novelist

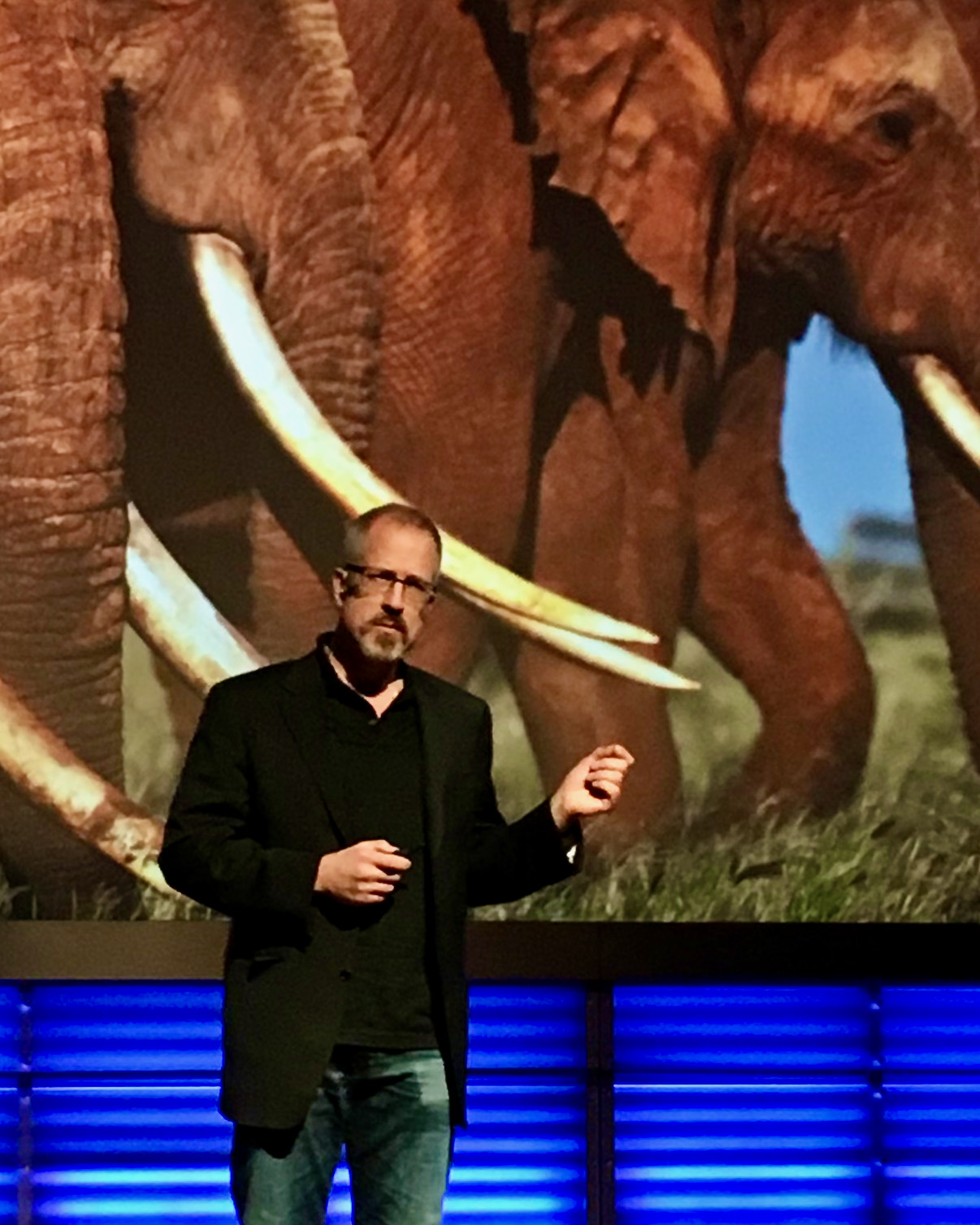
- Born: Neubrücke, West Germany
- Education: The Pennsylvania State University, Cornell University, University of Michigan Law School, University of Tokyo
- Occupations: Author, international trade lawyer, journalist; presenter
- Notable work: In the Company of Killers, The Lizard King, Warlords of Ivory
- Awards: 2014 National Geographic Rolex Explorer of the Year, 2016 Wildscreen Panda Award for Best Presenter
- Website: https://bryanchristy.com/

Bryan Christy is an American author and investigative journalist. He is the founder and former director of National Geographic Special Investigations and a National Geographic Society Rolex Explorer of the Year. Christy worked as a writer and chief correspondent for National Geographic Magazine, an Explorer Series television host, a documentary filmmaker, speaker, and educator. In 2008, Christy published his non-fiction book The Lizard King: The True Crimes and Passions of the World's Greatest Reptile Smugglers. In 2017, Christy left National Geographic to focus on his first novel, In the Company of Killers which was published on April 13, 2021.

== Early life ==
Born on a U.S. Army base in Neubrücke, Germany, Christy grew up in Millville, New Jersey where he began his professional life as a mortician's apprentice working in his family's funeral home.

== Education ==
Christy graduated from Pennsylvania State University and Cornell University’s FALCON Japanese Program. He then studied law, receiving a juris doctor degree from the University of Michigan Law School. Christy was a Fulbright Scholar at the University of Tokyo Law School.

== Career ==
After passing the CPA and bar exams, Christy practiced international trade law in Washington DC. He worked on topics such as US-Japan supercomputer trade, Norwegian whaling, and the sale of light-water nuclear reactors to North Korea. Christy left law to pursue a career as a journalist. His first investigation, Curse of the Double Eagle for Playboy, focused on the world's most valuable coin, a 1933 gold piece promoted by Sotheby's and its partner the US Mint as the only one in existence. In his article, Curse of the Double Eagle, Christy discovered a second coin and exposed the one-of-a-kind auction. The existence of more coins led to a U.S. Supreme Court case.

He spent three years researching reptile trafficking before publishing the non-fiction book The Lizard King: The True Crimes and Passions of the World's Greatest Reptile Smugglers and the National Geographic feature, The Kingpin, which contributed to the prosecution and imprisonment of Anson Wong, "the Pablo Escobar of wildlife trafficking" and the passage of new wildlife laws in Malaysia. While researching The Lizard King, Christy "was bitten between the eyes by a blood python, chased by a mother alligator, sprayed by a bird-eating tarantula, and ejaculated on by a Bengal tiger".

After the publication of The Lizard King, Christy began writing for National Geographic and helped found the magazine's Special Investigations Unit. His 2012 National Geographic cover feature Blood Ivory: Ivory Worship exposed Asia's ivory carving industry leading to a response from the Vatican following pressure over the use of illegal ivory in religious icons. The feature investigation was made into the 2013 National Geographic documentary Battle for the Elephants which won Best Conservation Film at the 2013 Jackson Hole Wildlife Film Festival. For its 125th anniversary, National Geographic Magazine named Christy's work One of Ten Ways National Geographic Has Changed the World.

In 2015, Christy completed an in-depth undercover operation Tracking Ivory where he designed fake elephant tusks armed with satellite-based GPS systems to hunt terrorists operating in central Africa. During the investigation, Christy was arrested in Tanzania and held as a suspected ivory trafficker. Tracking Ivory was featured on the cover of National Geographic. In 2016, Christy produced the Emmy-nominated documentary, Warlords of Ivory For his performance in the film Christy won a 2016 Wildscreen Panda Award for Best Presenter.

Christy then turned his focus to the illegal rhino horn trade, producing the Special Investigation: Inside the Deadly Rhino Horn Trade for National Geographic in 2016.

In 2017, Christy left National Geographic to focus on his first novel, In the Company of Killers, which released to the public on April 13, 2021.

== Monsters of God (2026) ==
In 2026, HBO Documentary Films released a 5-part documentary series "Monsters of God" inspired by Christy's 2008 nonfiction book "The Lizard King: The True Crimes and Passions of the World's Greatest Reptile Smugglers". The book's main characters appear as featured subjects in "Monsters of God", alongside Christy himself.

"Monsters of God" had its world premiere at the 2026 South by Southwest Film & TV Festival on March 13, 2026, where it won the Audience Award in the TV Premiere section.

Directed by Eric Goode and co-produced with A24, the HBO series premieres on August 6, 2026.

== Testimony before the United States House Committee on Foreign Affairs ==
In 2017, Christy testified before the Committee on Foreign Affairs of the United States House of Representatives during a hearing on U.S. interests in Africa. He shared his knowledge and experience in the region with regards to illegal wildlife trade and connections to transnational organized crime and terrorism. National Geographic Society President and CEO Gary E. Knell was quoted saying, “Given his sterling credentials and valuable reporting on Africa, we are proud that Mr. Christy was given the opportunity to speak before the Foreign Affairs Committee. He represents the best of what National Geographic Society has to offer, and we are pleased that the Committee considered his testimony as part of a serious commitment to enhancing the relationship between the United States and Africa."

== Works ==
=== Novels ===
- 2021: In the Company of Killers

=== Non-fiction ===
- 2008: The Lizard King: The True Crimes and Passions of the World's Greatest Reptile Smugglers

=== Journalism ===
- 2004: "Curse of the Double Eagle," Playboy Magazine.
- 2010: "The Kingpin," National Geographic.
- 2010: "The Serpent King," Foreign Policy.
- 2010: "Wildlife Smuggling: Why Does Wildlife Crime Reporting Suck?," The Huffington Post.
- 2012: "Blood Ivory: Ivory Worship," National Geographic.
- 2015: "Still Life," National Geographic.
- 2015: "Tracking Ivory," National Geographic.
- 2016: "Special Investigation: Inside the Deadly Rhino Horn Trade," National Geographic.

=== Film/Television ===
- 2009: "Undercover in a Reptile Slaughterhouse," Bryan Christy on Assignment.
- 2013: "Battle for the Elephants," National Geographic.
- 2013: "God's Ivory," Reportage by Getty Images.
- 2016: "Warlords of Ivory," National Geographic.

=== Appearances ===
- 2010: Interviewed on the "Diane Rehm Show" to discuss the ivory trade.
- 2012: Interviewed on PBS NewsHour to discuss Asia's illegal ivory trade.
- 2013: Interviewed on MSNBC's "Now with Alex Wagner" following publication of "Blood Ivory: Ivory Worship".
- 2013: Interviewed on CNN's "Amanpour" following screening of "Battle for the Elephants".
- 2015: Interviewed on NPR's "Fresh Air" with Terry Gross to discuss his work in "Tracking Ivory".
- 2015: Interviewed on BBC's "NewsDay" to discuss his work in "Tracking Ivory".
- 2015: Interviewed on RTL Netherlands "Late Night" to discuss his work surrounding Joseph Kony and the Ivory trade.
- 2015: Interviewed on ABC News' "Nightline" to discuss his work in "Tracking Ivory".
- 2016: Guest on "The Daily Show with Trevor Noah".
- 2016: Interviewed on NPR's "Fresh Air" with Terry Gross to discuss the illegal rhino horn trade.

== Awards ==
- 2013 Jackson Hole Wildlife Film Festival, Best Conservation Film "Battle for the Elephants"
- 2014 National Geographic Rolex Explorer of the Year
- 2016 Wildscreen Panda Award, Best Presenter "Warlords of Ivory"

== See also ==
- Dawie Groenewald
