= Wong Keng Liang =

Malaysian wildlife smuggler

- Born: 16 June 1958 (age 68)
- Other name: Anson
- Occupation: Wildlife trader
- Organization(s): Sungai Rusa Wildlife; CBS Wildlife
- Known for: Wildlife smuggling
- Status: Released
- Convictions: Conspiracy, smuggling, money laundering, lying to the US government, violating wildlife laws
- Penalty: 71 months imprisonment and $60,000 fine Five years imprisonment (reduced to 17-and-a-half months on appeal)
- Accomplice: Cheah Bing Shee

Wong Keng Liang (born 16 June 1958) is a Malaysian animal smuggler, known as the "Lizard King" or the "Pablo Escobar of animal trafficking" from the book The Lizard King by Bryan Christy. He was arrested after running the biggest global animal smuggling ring to be taken down.

Wong founded a reptile export company in the early 1980s and, by the end of the decade, had established a large network of illegal wildlife trafficking operations from his base in Penang, where wildlife protection laws were weak and rarely enforced. He was targeted by the United States Fish and Wildlife Service (USFWS) in Operation Chameleon from 1995, which eventually saw him extradited to the United States from Mexico to be sentenced to 71 months in prison in June 2001. He resumed his smuggling operations upon his release, before being arrested by the Malaysian authorities in 2010. He was released in 2012 after securing a successful appeal against the length of his sentence. Despite having had many of his animals seized during his recent arrest, he is believed to have once again resumed illegally smuggling wildlife since his release.

== Smuggling career ==
Wong ran Sungai Rusa Wildlife in Penang, a legal reptile export company founded in the early 1980s. However, as well as legal exports he also smuggled snow leopard pelts, panda bear skins, rhino horns, rare birds, Komodo dragons, chinchillas, gorillas, tigers and elephants from Australia, China, Madagascar, New Zealand, South America, and elsewhere to markets largely in Europe, Japan, and the United States. One species he exported, the Gray's monitor, had been thought to be extinct. With more protected species he exploited his country's weaker wildlife protection laws and easily corruptible customs officials in order to verify the animal's documentation, thereby allowing him to sell the animals elsewhere in the world. From his base in Penang, he boasted to an undercover American agent in March 1997 that "I can get anything here from anywhere, nothing can be done to me. I could sell a panda — and, nothing. As long as I’m here, I’m safe."

=== United States sting operation ===
Wong became a target of the United States Fish and Wildlife Service (USFWS), who set up a sting operation code-named Operation Chameleon. The USFWS set up animal reptile companies and first made contact with Sungai Rusa Wildlife in October 1995, establishing a business relationship. Wong went on to use a corrupt employee in the FedEx facility in Phoenix, Arizona, to express mail protected species such as false gharial and radiated tortoises. He also used an American mule, James Burroughs, to fly from Malaysia with Madagascan radiated tortoises who had their legs taped inside their shells. The tortoises were bundled in black socks and packed at the bottom of legal reptile shipments.

In order to lure Wong out of Malaysia, undercover agents agreed to meet him in Mexico with the promise of a trade in lucrative bear bile. He was arrested immediately after landing in Mexico City, and was extradited to the United States after a two-year court battle. In June 2001, a California court sentenced Wong to 71 months in prison (with credit for 34 months served in Mexico), a $60,000 fine, and banned him from exporting to the United States for three years after his release. In fact, he continued to export wildlife to the United States during his incarceration and immediately after his release via Sungai Rusa Wildlife and a new company he founded with Cheah Bing Shee, CBS Wildlife.

"They'll definitely be coming with papers. I will have a fall guy and he will get arrested. Plus the goods will be confiscated, and the goods will be sold to me by the department."

— Wong told an American undercover agent that he could smuggle Timor pythons by exploiting corruption in the Malaysian government.

=== Release and re-arrest ===
Wong returned to Malaysia upon his release and subsequently received funding and land from the Penang government to construct a tiger zoo. High-ranking wildlife protection official Misliah Mohamad Basir explained that the authorities there considered him a legitimate businessman who had been framed by the USFWS. However, an exposé in National Geographic led to an outcry among the Malaysian public and the funding was revoked, wildlife laws were tightened and Misliah was transferred to a different position. Wong switched to mainly smuggling reptiles as he felt they were not as protected as other species.

One relatively minor smuggling operation was discovered at Kuala Lumpur International Airport in summer 2010 when investigators examined a broken lock on a suitcase and found nearly 100 baby boa constrictors, two rhinoceros vipers, and a South American mata mata turtle, all hidden inside. Wong was arrested after he came to collect the suitcase. The Malaysian government then took action to restrict Wong and his activities: business licenses were revoked, his zoo was shut down, and animal collection – including his bengal tigers – seized. He faced a criminal charge for smuggling the endangered boa constrictors. Wong claimed that he had not applied for a permit simply because the customer was rushing him to get the snakes in time for Eid al-Fitr.

In November 2010, a judge sentenced Wong to five years in prison, a strict sentence for animal smuggling by most nation's standards and completely unprecedented in Malaysian legal history. Earlier in 2010, a Malaysian woman had been sentenced to eight months in prison in Madagascar for smuggling critically endangered Angonoka tortoises to Malaysia; Wong was never tried for his alleged involvement.

=== Release on appeal ===
On 22 February 2012, Wong was freed after the Court of Appeal accepted his appeal to reduce the jail sentence from five years to 17 1/2 months. Justice Datuk Wira Low Hop Bing noted that "It is trite law that Wong's plea of guilt is a mitigating factor. It is trite law that the fact Wong was the first offender is another mitigating factor". Speaking in 2015, Daniel Tanuwidjaja, an Indonesian animal smuggler, admitted that he still was regularly dealing with Wong and his wife following Wong's release from prison. Tanuwidjaja said that he paid off wildlife and customs officials in both Indonesia and Malaysia to avoid arrest. A documentary investigatory team discovered a number of shell companies and exotic wildlife in Malaysia linked to Wong, demonstrating the country's continued struggle with corruption and enforcement of its wildlife laws.
