= King Lizard =

English hard rock band

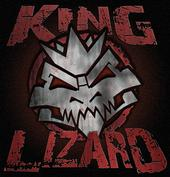

Background information
- Origin: London, UK
- Genre: Hard rock
- Years active: 2002–2015
- Label: Bad Reputation
- Past members: Flash Roxx; Niro Knox; Lee Benz; Moyano El Buffalo; Adam Broderick; Jericho Berrowitz; Sky London; Drake Kelly; Alice Rain; Arnaldo Rogano

King Lizard was a four-piece rock band from London, England.

== Biography ==
The band first formed in 2002, and after extensive line-up changes, took its final form in 2010.

Lead singer Flash Roxx started the band at age 19. Sky London became the band's drummer after the original one left. Israeli guitarist Niro Knox, who was in a band called Skintight Jaguars, then joined. Last to join the band was bassist Alice Rain, who came from Rome to London to find a band. In 2010, Lee Benz replaced Alice Rain on bass, and Moyano El Buffalo replaced Sky London on drums.

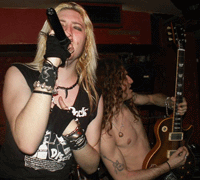
King Lizard

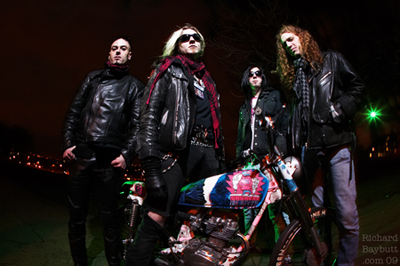
King Lizard

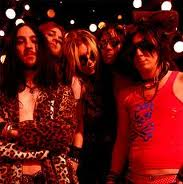
King Lizard

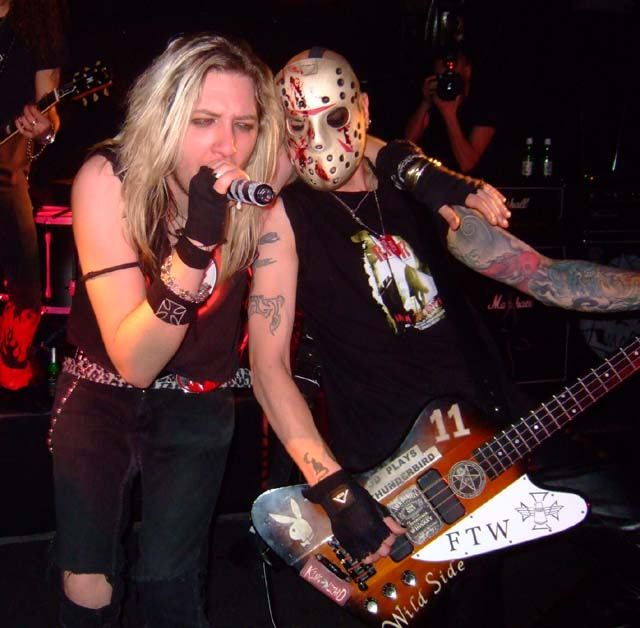
King Lizard

== Discography ==
- Late Night Dynamite EP (2007)
- Viva La Decadence (Psycho DeVito Records 2010)
- Nightmare Livin' the Dream (2012)
- Live Bites (2013)

== Videos ==
- Hard to Get
- Viva La Decadence
- Rock 'n Roll Me
- Rain on You
- Not For Me
- A Nightmare Livin' the Dream
- Just to Hear You Say It

== Videos ==
- "Viva La Decadence"– Title song from the album "Viva La Decadence". Produced by Adi Koren and King Lizard
- "Rock and Roll Me" – A professionally made video, shot mainly in black and white.
- "Hard To Get" – A performance video, cut from several live gigs.
- Outrageous (Live) – A Live performance at the Barfly, London. 23.12.07
